= Better Place (company) =

American electric car battery charging company

- Type: Venture backed private
- Industry: Transport
- Founded: 2007
- Founder: Shai Agassi
- Defunct: 2013
- Fate: Bankrupt, liquidated in 2013
- Headquarters: Palo Alto, California, United States
- Key people: Idan Ofer (Chairman); Dan Cohen (Chief Executive Officer)
- Products: Subscription-based electric car charging points and battery-switching stations Retail deliveries since 2Q 2012 in Israel
- Website: BetterPlace.com

Better Place was a venture-backed international company that developed and sold battery charging and battery switching services for electric cars. It was formally based in Palo Alto, California, but the bulk of its planning and operations were steered from Israel, where both its founder Shai Agassi and its chief investors resided.

The company opened its first functional charging station the first week of December 2008 at Cinema City in Pi-Glilot near Tel Aviv, Israel. The first customer deliveries of Renault Fluence Z.E. electric cars enabled with battery switching technology began in Israel in the second quarter of 2012, and at peak in mid September 2012, there were 21 operational battery-swap stations open to the public in Israel.

Better Place filed for bankruptcy in Israel in May 2013. The company's financial difficulties were caused by mismanagement, wasteful efforts to establish toeholds and run pilots in too many countries, the high investment required to develop the charging and swapping infrastructure, and a market penetration far lower than originally predicted by Shai Agassi. Fewer than 1,000 Fluence Z.E. cars were deployed in Israel and around 400 units in Denmark, after spending about US$850 million in private capital. After two failed post-bankruptcy acquisition attempts, the bankruptcy receivers sold off the remaining assets in November 2013 to Gnrgy for only $450,000.

== History ==
=== Launch ===
The company was publicly launched on October 29, 2007, as Project Better Place, by Shai Agassi, the company's founder and CEO at the time. According to Agassi, his vision was inspired by a question asked by Klaus Schwab at the 2005 World Economic Forum in Davos, Switzerland: "How do you make the world a better place by 2020?" As of January 2011 it had raised $700 million, and about a third was spent in setting up the battery switch stations. Also, several countries and states had offered tax breaks.

Better Place announced deployment of electric vehicle networks in Israel, Denmark and Hawaii in 2008 and 2009. The company planned to deploy the infrastructure on a country-by-country basis, and said it was in talks with more than 25 additional regions around the world. Australia, Ontario, Oregon, and California also announced deployment of Better Place electric car networks.

In January 2008, Better Place announced a memorandum of understanding with Renault-Nissan to build the world's first Electric Recharge Grid Operator (ERGO) model for Israel. Under the agreement, Better Place would build the electric recharge grid, and Renault-Nissan would provide the electric vehicles.

=== Bankruptcy ===
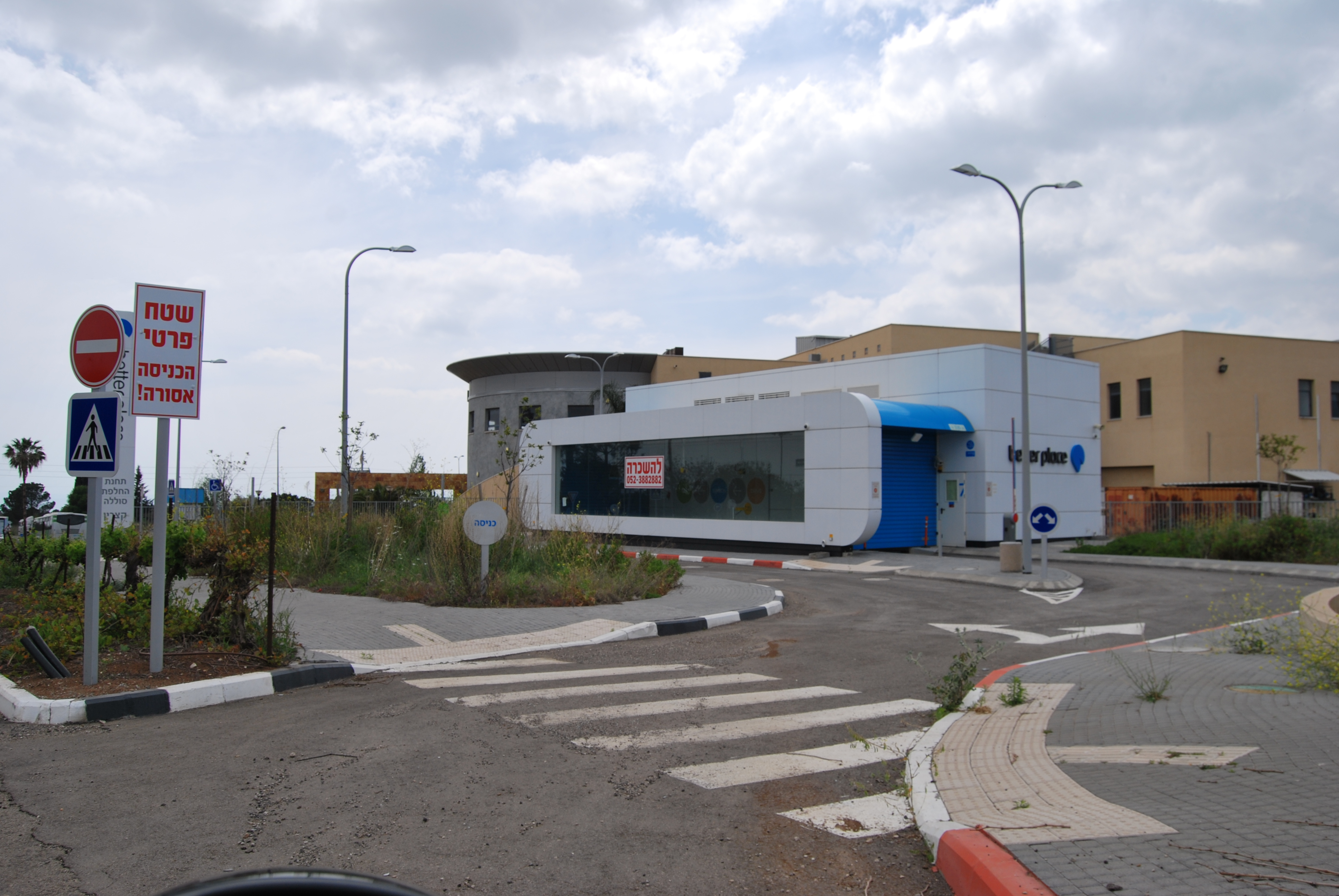
A shut-down battery swap station in Katzrin, Israel

On October 2, 2012, Agassi resigned from his role as worldwide Better Place CEO, and was replaced by Evan Thornley, CEO of Better Place-Australia. Agassi briefly remained on the company board, but a week later he resigned from that position as well. A few days after Thornley's appointment, Better Place asked its investors for a round of emergency funding, totalling about $100 million. On October 29, 2012, Ynet reported that Better Place would lay off 150 to 200 members of its 400-person staff in Israel that week as it sought financing to combat its cash-flow problems.

In late January 2013, Thornley was fired by Chairman Idan Ofer, and Dan Cohen was named acting CEO by the board. As a consequence of the financial problems, the Australian rollout was put on hold, as the company decided to concentrate on its two existing markets. However, on 26 May 2013, Better Place filed for bankruptcy in Israel. Following the decision of the board of directors of the global company, Better Place Danmark A/S also decided to initiate bankruptcy proceedings on the same date.

The company's financial difficulties were caused by the high investment required to develop the charging and swapping infrastructure, about US$850 million in private capital, and market penetration significantly lower than originally predicted by Shai Agassi, who expected 100,000 cars on Israeli roads by 2010. Fewer than 1,000 Fluence Z.E. cars were deployed in Israel and around 400 cars in Denmark. Under Better Place's business model, the company owned the Fluence Z.E. batteries, so the court liquidator would have to decide what to do with customers who do not have ownership of the battery and risk being left with a useless car.

=== Post-bankruptcy acquisition attempts and liquidation ===
In July 2013, an attempt to acquire Better Place was made by the Sunrise group that comprised entrepreneur Yosef Abramowitz and the Association for the Advancement of Electric Transportation in Israel. Court filings showed that the acquisition would be worth 18 million Israeli shekels (US$5 million) for Better Place's assets in Israel, and 25 million Israeli shekels (US$7 million) for its intellectual property, held by Better Place Switzerland. The deal was canceled by the court after the Sunrise group failed to make the first agreed payment of 3.52 million shekels (US$976,300), even after an extension.

In August 2013, the Central District Court ruled that Better Place Israel would be sold to Success Assets Ltd., owned by Tsahi Merkur, for 11 million shekels (US$3million). To effect the acquisition, Merkur was to sign a personal guarantee within seven days for the full amount of the acquisition, and a personal guarantee for a letter of indemnification covering the guarantees made by Better Place Israel's subsidiaries to the Ministry of Transport. Within 21 days, Merkur was to deposit with the company's special managers an opinion on a property on which a commitment to register a lien of up to 5 million shekels would be placed. By 30 September 2013 he was to make a payment of 2 million shekels. On 17 October 2013 the deal was canceled after Success Assets failed to make the required payments.

In November 2013, the court-appointed receivers decided to sell the remaining assets of Better Place in parts and liquidate the business.

== Business model ==
=== History of the battery swap concept ===
The steam car, the internal combustion engine automobile, and the electric car emerged as the main competing technologies in the late 1890s until the 1920s. The concept of exchangeable battery service was first proposed as early as 1896 in order to overcome the limited operating range of electric cars and trucks.

The concept was first put into practice by Hartford Electric Light Company through the GeVeCo battery service and was initially available for electric trucks. The vehicle owner purchased the vehicle from General Vehicle Company (GeVeCo, a subsidiary of the General Electric Company) without a battery and the electricity was purchased from Hartford Electric through an exchangeable battery. The owner paid a variable per-mile charge and a monthly service fee to cover maintenance and storage of the truck. Both vehicles and batteries were modified to facilitate a fast battery exchange. The service was provided between 1910 and 1924 and during that period vehicles using it covered more than 6 million miles. Beginning in 1917 a similar service was operated in Chicago for owners of Milburn Light Electric cars who also could buy the vehicle without the batteries.

Electric forklifts have used battery swapping since at least 1946 and a rapid battery replacement system was implemented to help maintain 50 electric buses at the 2008 Summer Olympics in China.

=== Better Place business model ===
Better Place implemented a business model wherein customers entered into subscriptions to purchase driving distance similar to the mobile telephone industry from which customers contract for minutes of airtime. The initial cost of an electric vehicle might also have been subsidized by the ongoing per-distance revenue contract just as mobile handset purchases are subsidized by per-minute mobile service contracts. Better Place's goal was to enable electric cars to sell for $5,000 less than the price of the average gasoline car sold in the United States, or the impact of electric cars would be minimal. For example, the Prius hybrid had been sold for 13 years at a price of $4,000 more than other gasoline cars and had captured less than 2% of the worldwide car market.

The Better Place approach was to enable manufacturing and sales of different electric cars separately from their standardized batteries in the same way that petrol cars are sold separately from their fuel. Petrol is not purchased upfront, but is bought a few times a month when the fuel tank needs filling. Similarly, the Better Place monthly payment would cover electric "fuel" costs including battery, daily charging and battery swaps. Better Place was to allow customers to pay incrementally for battery costs including electric power, battery life, degradation, warranty problems, maintenance, capital cost, quality, technology advancement and anything else related to the battery. The per-distance fees would cover battery pack leasing, charging and swap infrastructure, purchasing sustainable electricity, profits, and the cost of investor capital. All battery problems would be handled by Better Place, which would then bundle the costs and bill their customers monthly for providing all the infrastructure.

The Better Place electric car charging infrastructure network was based on a smart grid software platform using Intel Atom processors and .NET Framework, or comparable vendors. This platform was the first of its kind in the world and was to enable Better Place to manage the charging of hundreds of thousands of electric cars simultaneously by automatically time-shifting recharging away from peak demand hours of the day, preventing overload of the electrical grid of the host country. According to Agassi, Better Place would be able to provide electricity for millions of electric cars without adding a single electricity generator or transmission line by using smart software that oversaw and managed the recharging of electric cars connected with Better Place. A critique of the company's business model was later published.

Better Place encouraged governments to mandate the use of international standards and open access to recharge across charging networks to facilitate competing networks. Standardization efforts such as SAE J1772, however, had not yet yielded global consensus as of August 2009. Better Place displayed Charge Spot charging stations that used a connector with the same pin layout as SAE J1772-2009 but housed in a non-standard, triangular plug. They also displayed a wall mounted charging station using IEC 62196 Type 2 receptacle. Battery pack switching outside of Better Place's network was not to be allowed. Better Place said it had pre-sold enough contracts to make its first deployed network in Israel profitable at launch.

== Energy sources ==
Agassi stated that the company's plan was to have the network's electricity generated entirely by renewable energy from solar arrays and wind farms if necessary, thus invalidating the "long-smokestack" accusation leveled against electric vehicles which rely on the nonrenewable sources of the electricity. However, achieving the 100% renewable energy goal would have depended on the local electric grid's energy sources.

In Israel, where the first Better Place deployment took place, the electric grid is based mostly on fossil fuels, rendering the renewable energy vision practically impossible in the short term.

== Cars and batteries ==
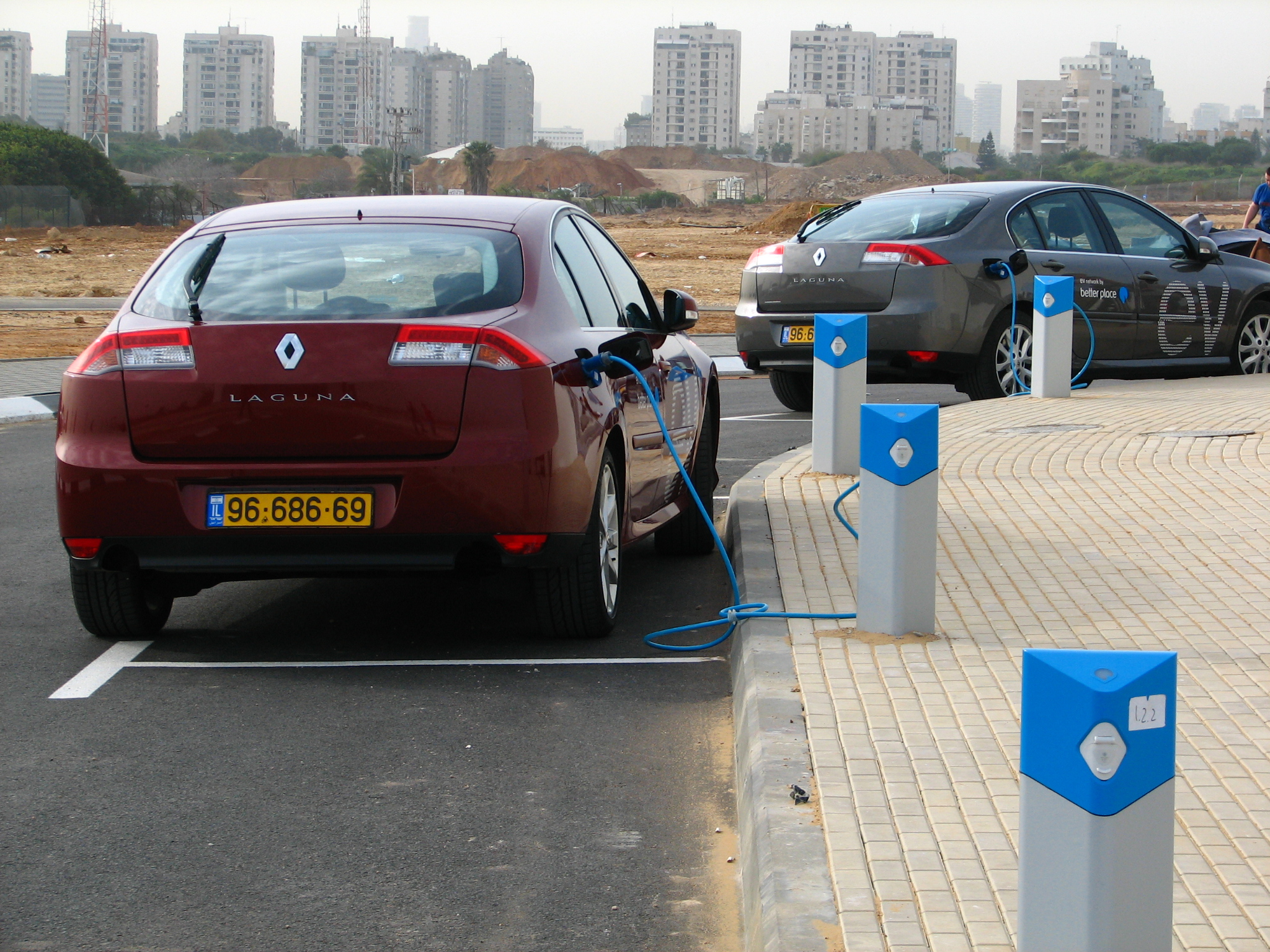
Prototype modified Renault Laguna EVs charging at the Better Place visitor centre in Ramat Hasharon, Israel, north of Tel Aviv.

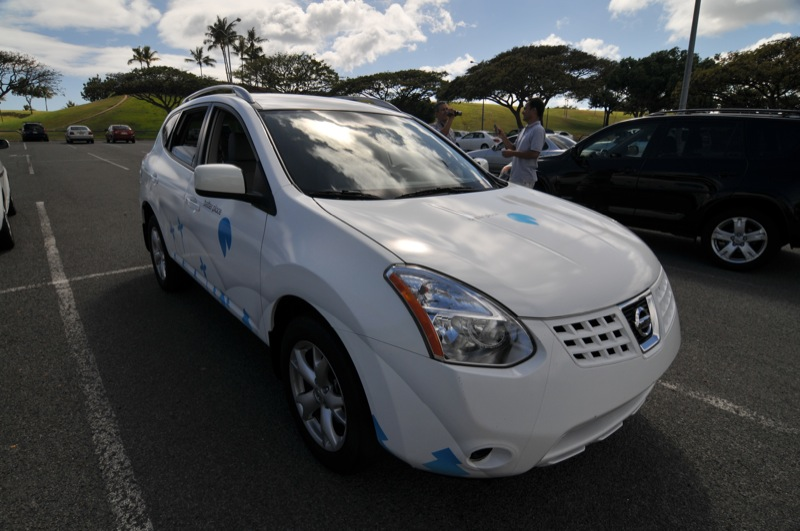
Nissan eRogue in Hawaii.

The first prototype car was the Renault Laguna with a battery instead of a fuel tank and an electric motor instead of an internal combustion engine. The battery for electric vehicles was a Lithium iron phosphate ion device. The range of the car running on just one battery was from about 160 kilometres (99 mi) to 190 kilometres (120 mi). By replacing the battery at a battery switch station, the range between longer charging stops was to be limited only by the geographical distribution of the battery-swapping infrastructure.

The second demo car was the Nissan eRogue, an electric car based on the Renault-Nissan Rogue, halfway between a sedan and an SUV in size.

The Renault Fluence Z.E. was announced at the Frankfurt Motor Show on September 15, 2009, as the first electric car to be available on the Better Place network using a switchable battery. Shai Agassi said that EVs had to be priced at $5,000 less than the price of the average gasoline car to be successful. In April 2010 Renault announced that sales of the Fluence Z.E. were scheduled for 2011 in Israel, Denmark and the rest of Europe. In August 2010 Better Place announced a non-binding order of 100,000 Renault Fluence ZE and four months later Better Place claimed to have sold 70,000 cars from that order, a year away from the public launch of its network.

The floor-mounted battery packs in these electric cars were designed to be changed out robotically in less than two minutes, which was quicker than the average petroleum refuel, allowing for battery-swap services like those proposed by Better Place and Tesla Motors. Better Place expected battery packs to cost between US 4¢ and 5¢ per mile over their life, provide the cars with a 160 km (99 mi) range per charge, perform for 2000 recharge cycles, and last for 8 years.

== Battery-swapping stations ==
With areas around cities covered with battery switching stations, also called battery-swap stations, drivers would potentially have electric cars with an unlimited driving range for long-distance trips. The QuickDrop battery switch system would enable Renault Fluence Z.E.'s battery, the only vehicle deployed in the Better Place network, to be swapped in approximately three minutes at dedicated battery exchange stations. The actual robotic battery switching operation took about five minutes in the deployed stations. While each exchange station would cost $500,000, the then CEO of Better Place, Shai Agassi, said that cost would be half the price of a typical petroleum fuelling station.

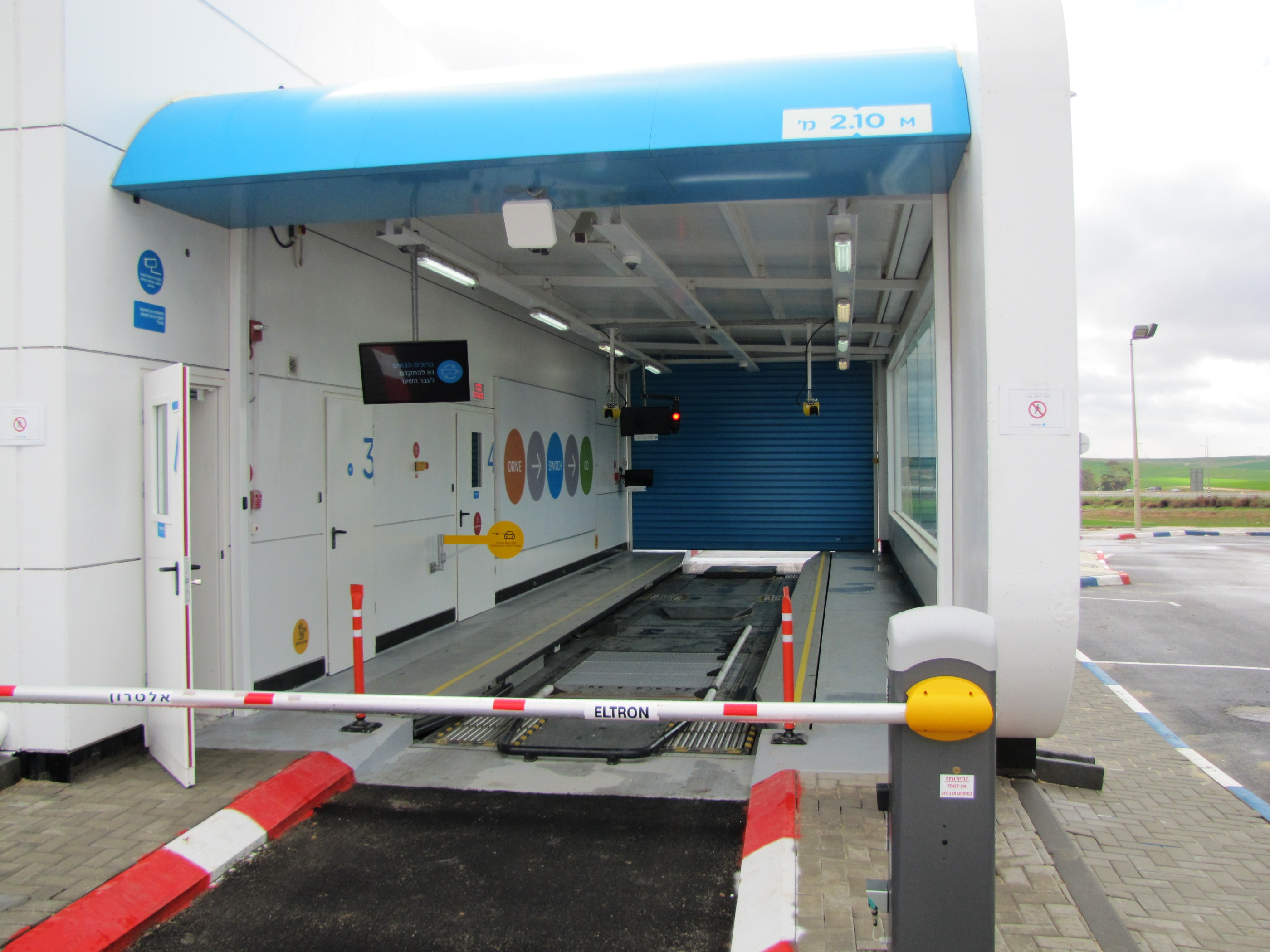
Better Place's battery switching Station in Israel

In order to access the battery switch station, Better Place customers would have to swipe their membership card. The remaining process was fully automated, similar to going through a car wash, so the driver never had to leave the car. In Better Place's demonstration battery switch stations, a robotic arm removed the depleted battery and replaced it with a full one.

During 2010, Better Place operated a demonstration battery switch station in Tokyo allowing three specially equipped cabs to exchange their car's depleted battery pack for a 100 miles (160 km) fully recharged one in 59.1 seconds on average. Better Place used the same technology to swap batteries that F-16 jet fighter aircraft use to load their bombs.

Better Place battery switch stations were claimed to support multiple battery types of all kinds of electric cars as long as the battery could be removed from under the car. A battery switch station using only 15 batteries allegedly had the ability to swap batteries for 2,500 EV's. Better Place claimed it had battery station installation teams who could install one battery switch station in just two days, one every 25 miles in every route and at the same cost of 7 days of oil in the United States, Better Place claimed it could cover all of the United States with battery switch stations and all the required infrastructure.

=== Battery switching versus DC fast charging ===
The main alternative technology to the battery switching technique promoted by Better Place is DC fast charging. A nationwide fast charging infrastructure is/was being deployed in the United States that by 2013 would cover the entire nation. DC Fast Chargers are going to be installed at 45 BP and ARCO locations and will be made available to the public as early as March 2011.

Better Place claimed that its subscription model had customers effectively paying only the prorated mileage cost without any battery ownership problems, whereas the fast charging model involves the customer bearing all the battery purchase, ownership, maintenance, and replacement costs, in addition to the cost of the electricity to recharge the battery.

Better Place claimed that far fewer fast charging and battery switch stations would be needed than the current number of petroleum fuel refill stations, because drivers would usually recharge ("refuel") electric cars at home, offices, shopping centers, commercial areas, and the like. Drivers would need alternatives only if they forgot to recharge, couldn't get to a charge spot, had insufficient time at a charge spot, or were driving non-stop in excess of 160-kilometre (99 mi), typical of long distance vacations and business trips.

DC fast charging was at the time considerably slower than Better Place's claimed 59-second battery switchover, but while Better Place battery switch stations would have cost around $500,000 each, DC fast chargers that the EV project is/was to deploy would cost only between $25,000 and $40,000.

=== Demonstration projects ===
==== Yokohama ====
On May 13, 2009, Better Place premiered their battery switching station to the public in Yokohama where they had been invited by the Japanese Ministry of the Environment. The battery switching station demonstrated was set up similarly to a gas station automatic car wash. The vehicle drove up on a ramp and was aligned on the swapping pad. The battery shuttle then engaged and rose up toward the bottom of the vehicle. It made contact with the battery, released it, lowered it, and moved the depleted battery pack away from the car. The charged battery pack was then inserted. The discharged battery was returned to the charging bay. The battery switch was complete in less than two minutes and the vehicle drove away. The battery swap was designed to require less time than filling a tank of gas. In order to keep electric vehicles in demand, Better Place was going to try to keep the vehicles competitive with the other cars on the market. By building infrastructure that made owning an electric car more practical, they hoped to increase demand.

The first prototype battery switch station opened in Yokohama, Japan on May 14, 2009, was designed by Yoav Heichal, chief engineer for Better Place research and development group.

The company signed an agreement with Dor Alon Energy to install battery replacement points, which would run alongside the petroleum refueling station' normal business. Dor Alon CEO, Israel Yaniv, said, "Dor Alon is the first energy company that will enable owners of electric car owners of the future to obtain electric refueling services at its gas stations. We consider this agreement with Better Place to be a strategic partnership that will create real value and innovation for the company's activity."

==== Tokyo ====
In April 2010, a 90-day switchable-battery electric taxi demonstration project was launched in Tokyo, using three Nissan Rogue crossover utility vehicles, converted into electric cars with switchable batteries provided by A123 Systems. The battery switch station deployed in Tokyo was more advanced than the Yokohama switch system demonstrated in 2009. During the three-month field test the EV taxis accumulated over 25,000 miles (40,000 km) and swapped batteries 2,122 times, with an average battery swap time of 59.1 seconds. Nissan decided to continue the trial until late November 2010.

==== San Francisco ====
In October 2010 Better Place announced its commitment to launch a three-year demonstration program with electric-powered taxis in the San Francisco Bay Area, in partnership with the cities of San Francisco and San Jose, California, taxi operators and carsharing programs, regional and state agencies, consumer and EV organizations, and the San Francisco Public Utilities Commission. The program would deploy and operate four battery switching stations in the San Francisco to San Jose corridor to support a fleet of switchable-battery EV taxis. As of December 2011, Better Place had made no further statements of progress on this program.

==== Netherlands ====
A battery-powered 10-taxi demonstration project was launched at Schiphol Airport, Amsterdam, in 2012.

== Investors ==
As of 2010, the company had raised US$700 million from various sources including, VantagePoint Venture Partners, Israel Corporation (33% ownership), Israel Cleantech Ventures, HSBC, Morgan Stanley, Acorns to Oaks II, Esarbee Investments Canada, GC Investments LLC, Musea Ventures, Ofer Group, Vyikra Partners, Wolfensohn & Co. and Maniv Energy Capital. In late 2007, Agassi began raising US$111 million in Series-A funding for the project, one of the largest and fastest seed rounds in history. Investors included VantagePoint Venture Partners, Israel Corporation, Israel Cleantech Ventures, Morgan Stanley, and private investors led by Michael Granoff of Maniv Energy Capital. In 2009, the company raised an additional US$135 million for Better Place Denmark, including an investment from DONG Energy, the leading utility in Denmark. Following the announcement in Israel, Better Place said it had launched its network in Denmark, Australia and in two United States locations – Hawaii and Northern California. The company said it was in talks with more than 25 countries around the world.

In Australia, Better Place announced agreements with AGL Energy and financial advisor Macquarie Capital Group to raise A$1,000,000,000 and begin deploying an electric vehicle (EV) network powered by renewable energy. According to Better Place, its model for sustainable mobility would help Australia move toward oil independence. With the world's seventh highest per capita rate of car ownership, the country had nearly 15 million cars on the road after adding over a million new cars in 2007.

In January 2010, as Israel Corporation completed its investment of US$100 million in the company, a consortium of investors signed a Series-B funding round to invest a further US$350 million in Better Place, citing their confidence that "Better Place has the technical and commercial solutions to allow for the mass adoption of electric cars in the near term." The Series-B round was led by HSBC, which invested US$125 million, and included all Series-A investors plus Morgan Stanley Investment Management and Lazard Asset Management. The deal represented one of the largest financial investments of its kind by HSBC, which gained a seat on the Better Place board of directors and approximately 10% of the company's shares.

From its early days, doubts were raised as to the effectiveness of Better Place's centralised model of providing charging infrastructure, with some anticipating that the model would not be widely adopted.

=== Partners ===
In May 2008, the company presented a prototype of its electric car at a press conference in Tel Aviv. Shai Agassi estimated that the company's partner, the Renault-Nissan alliance, would likely invest $500 million to $1 billion in developing the swappable-battery electric cars.

Further partnerships with other manufacturers were not announced, and Peter Rawlinson, VP and Chief Engineer for Vehicle Engineering at Tesla was quoted as saying "Different batteries suit different cars. It's far too simplistic to look at batteries as isolation."

Better Place also announced plans to develop electric recharge grids in the city of San Francisco and the state of Hawaii.

Australian finance group Macquarie said it would work with Better Place to fund the construction of plug-in stations, and Australian utility AGL Energy committed to powering those stations with renewable electricity.

== Response ==
In March 2008, Deutsche Bank analysts issued a glowing report on the company stating that its approach could be a "paradigm shift" that caused "massive disruption" to the auto industry, and which had "the potential to eliminate the gasoline engine altogether." Three months later, the same institution issued a second report, finding "electric vehicles destined for much more growth than is widely perceived". The same report stated that "[i]mprovements in battery technology will allow for increased power, increased electrical propulsion, and bigger gains in fuel economy."

On June 26, 2008, Shai Agassi testified before the United States House of Representatives Select Committee on Energy Independence and Global Warming. The hearing, titled "$4 Gasoline and Fuel Economy: Auto Industry at a Crossroads," dealt with the future role of the auto industry and the federal government in fighting gas prices and the fuel economy standards proposed in response to the enactment of the Energy Independence and Security Act (EISA) of 2007.

In 2009, CBS Money Watch cast doubts on Better Place's business model, noting that it would cost up to $500,000 to construct a battery switching station

== Markets and pricing ==
=== Australia ===
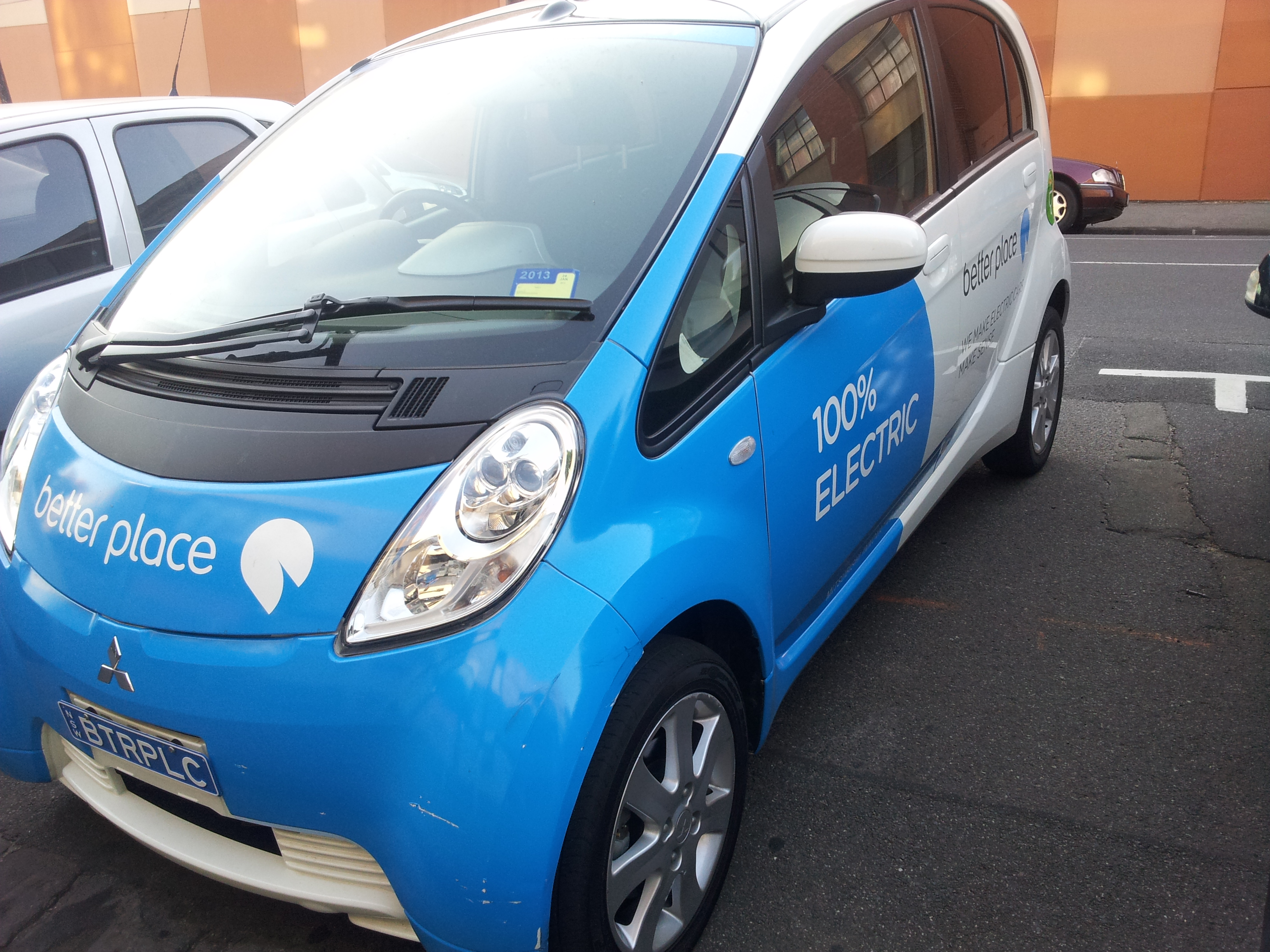
A Better Place Mitsubishi i-MiEV company car in Melbourne.

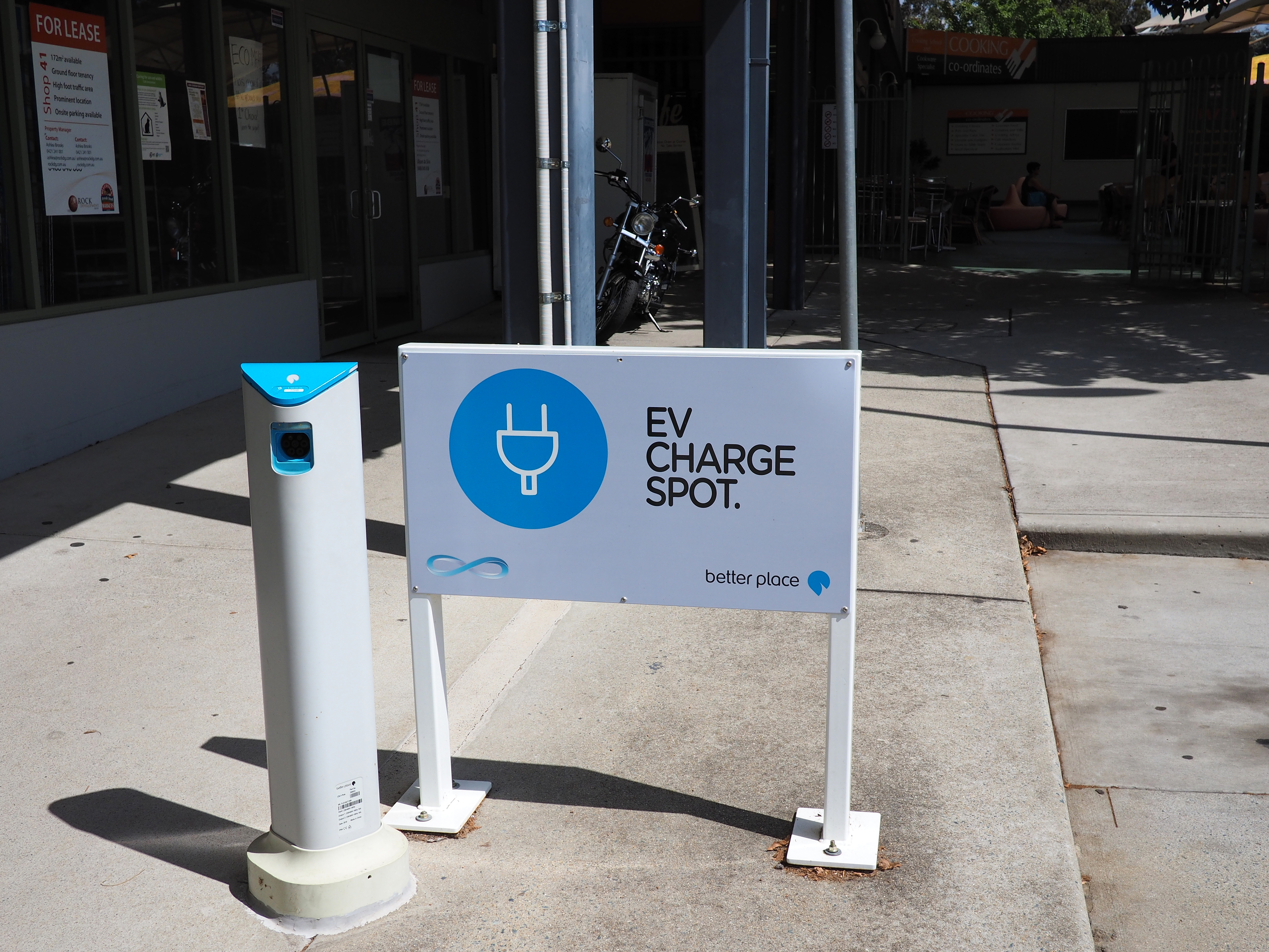
A public Better Place charging station in Canberra.

In Australia a roll-out of 500 charge stations was planned to begin in the major eastern coast cities before expanding nationally. It was estimated that these would give comparable coverage to the existing 13,000 petrol stations then in operation. The total cost of this roll out was claimed to be between $1 and $1.25 billion AUD.

The first charge spot was installed in Canberra in late 2011, but in January 2013, after fewer than 20 public charge spots had been installed the rollout was halted and the board of Better Place decided to concentrate on its two existing markets, Israel and Denmark.

Better Place was also to be the preferred provider of home and dealership charging stations for the Holden Volt, with the partnership announced in July 2012.

=== China ===
In 2011, Better Place announced an agreement with China Southern Power Grid Company, the world's eighth-largest utility company. Before the end of the year, Better Place was going to open a battery switch station and joint education center in the southern city of Guangzhou. Shai Agassi said that China Southern Grid was embracing battery switch as the primary means of range extension. China Southern Grid Chairman Zhao Jianguo said that the battery-switch model might become mainstream in China and that the joint visitor center and battery switch demonstration project with Better Place would help promote electric-car adoption in China by allowing potential customers to experience this innovative solution.

China Southern Power Grid pilot projects and other joint activities were supposed to explore the benefits that switchable-battery electric cars and the networked infrastructure that supports them might deliver to the electric grid in CSG's service area, which spanned five provinces, one million square kilometers, and 230 million people in Southern China.

Electric utility State Grid Corporation of China planned to build over 2,351 electric-charging and battery-swap stations by 2016. These would have had 220,000 charging poles, but they did not indicate how many, if any, of them would have been battery-swap stations. The director of the State Grid smart grid research center commented "The construction of a large-scale charging station costs 20 to 30 million yuan ($3.05–4.57 million) and a small-scale one costs less than 10 million yuan, but it costs more than 100 million yuan to build a battery-swap station."

In April 2010, Better Place signed a memorandum of understanding with Chery Automobile, China's biggest independent car maker, to develop prototypes for electric vehicles to be used in regional state-sponsored pilot projects.

=== Denmark ===
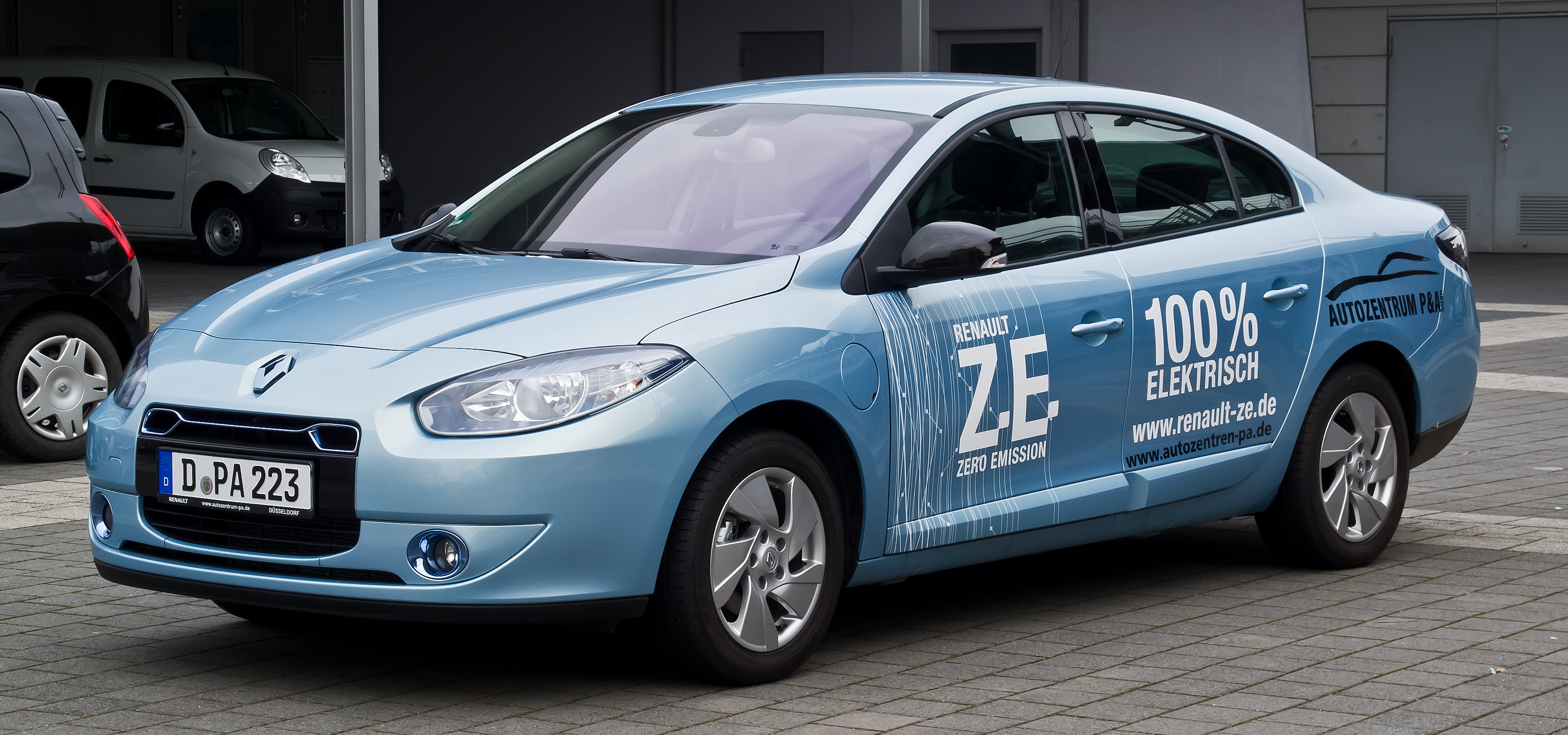
The Renault Fluence Z.E. was the electric car available on the Better Place network in Israel and Denmark.

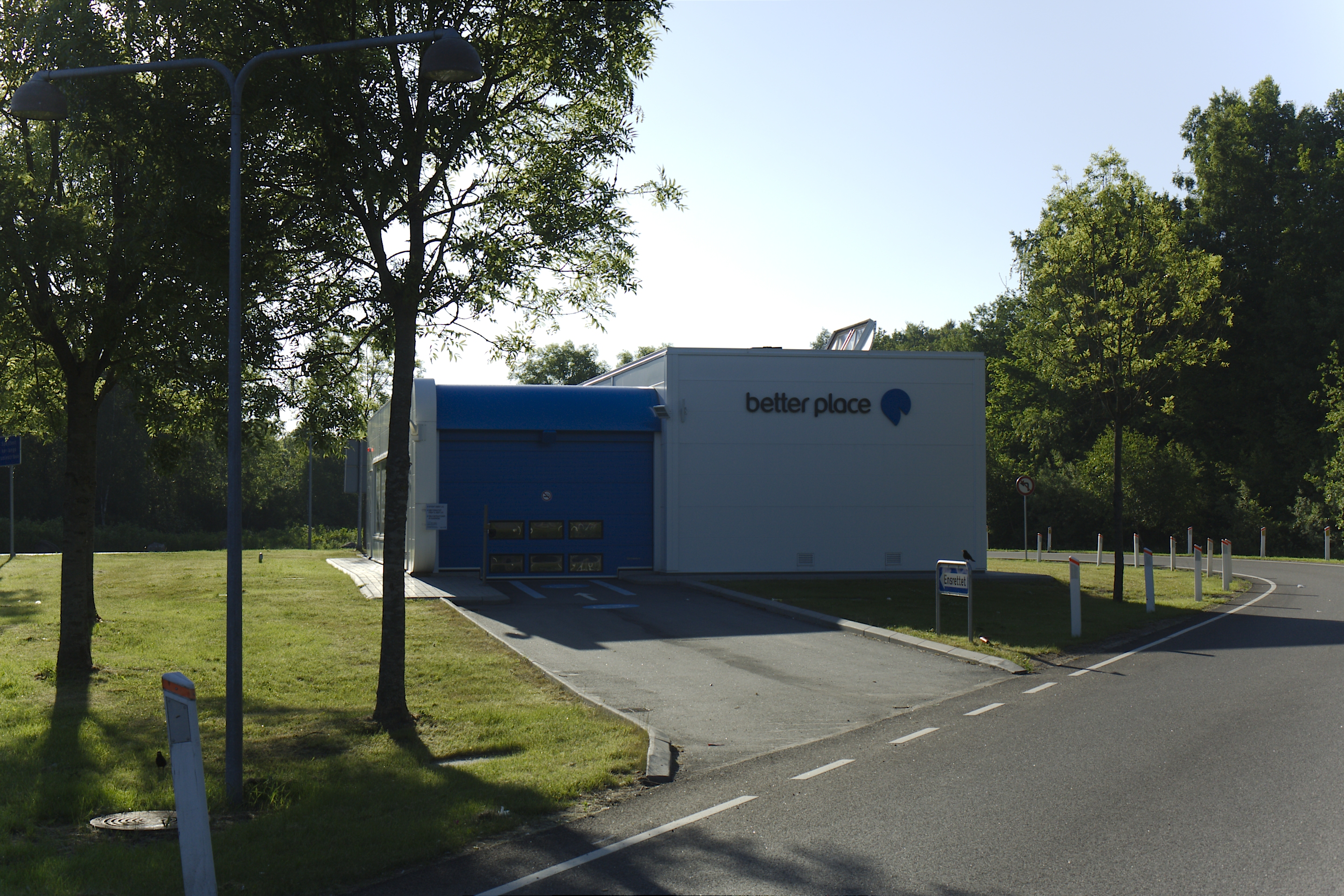
A Better Place battery swap station in Denmark.

Better Place partnered with Denmark's leading energy company, DONG Energy, in a €103 million Euro (770 million Danish Kroner) investment to introduce electric cars and infrastructure to Denmark. The country currently generates 20% of its electric power from wind energy, but much of it is exported because there is currently no way for utilities to store the excess power. Using the Better Place model, DONG hoped to take advantage of the existing electric grid and electric vehicle batteries to harness and store the abundance of wind-generated power, and distribute it appropriately for transportation consumption.

The Renault Fluence Z.E. sold in Denmark at a price of 205,000 DKK (€27,496 or US$38,378) including VAT plus the monthly fee for the switchable-battery. Consumers paid a one-time fee of 9,995 DKK (€1,341) for a private charging station and customers were offered a choice of five fixed-price switchable-battery packages based on kilometers driven per year. For more than 40,000 km (25,000 mi) a year the monthly fee was 2,995 DKK (€399) per month. The network commercial launch was in late 2011.

The first battery switch station in Denmark, out of 20 which were planned to be deployed across the country as part of the network of charging infrastructure, was unveiled in June 2011 at 55°44′1.5″N 12°27′36″E in Gladsaxe, near Copenhagen. Sales of the Fluence Z.E. began in late 2011, and 198 units were sold in Denmark through December 2012. Cumulative sales through April 2013 reached 234 units.

As of December 2012 there were 17 fully operational battery switch stations in the country, enabling Danish customers to drive anywhere across the country in an electric car. On 26 May 2013, and following the decision of the Board of Directors of Better Place's global company, Better Place Danmark A/S decided to begin bankruptcy proceedings. Because the batteries are owned by Better Place, Renault announced it would honor the existing agreement to around 500 customers that bought their electric cars through Better Place.

=== Hawaii ===
Better Place deployed about 80 charging stations and 154 charge points in Oahu, Maui, Kauai and the Big Island, and had almost 700 customers. The operation of the charging stations was acquired in March 2013 by OpConnect. No interruption of service was expected due to Better Place bankruptcy.

=== Israel ===
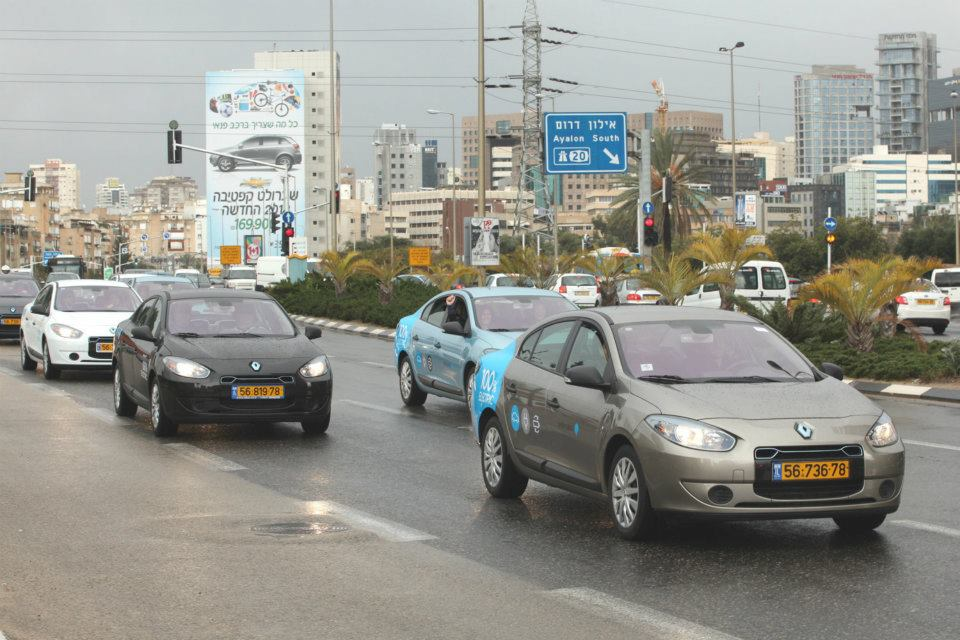
Parade of Renault Fluence Z.E. electric cars enabled with battery swapping technology to commemorate the first deliveries to Better Place employees in Israel in January 2012.

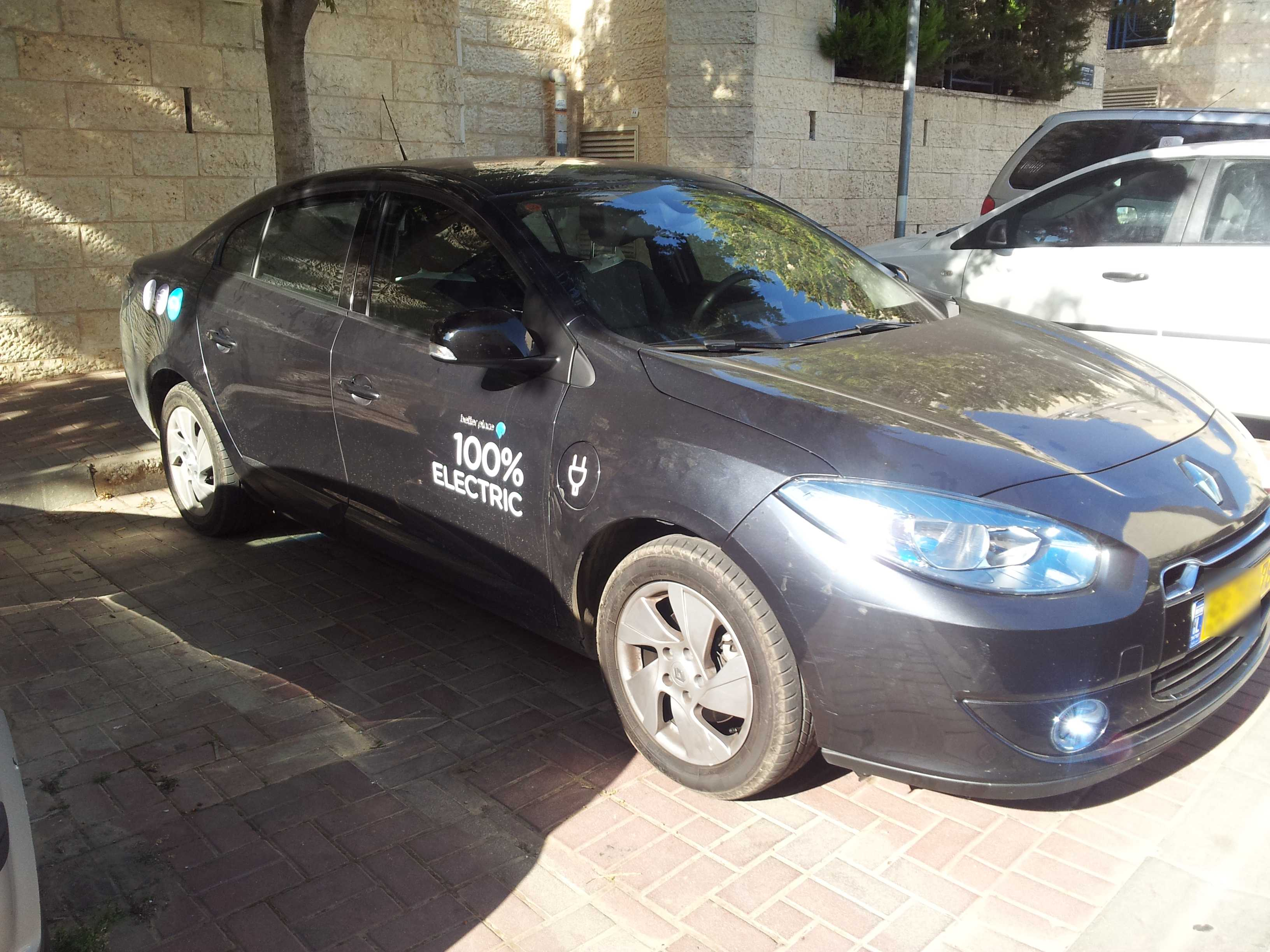
Renault Fluence Z.E. sold through Better Place in Israel.

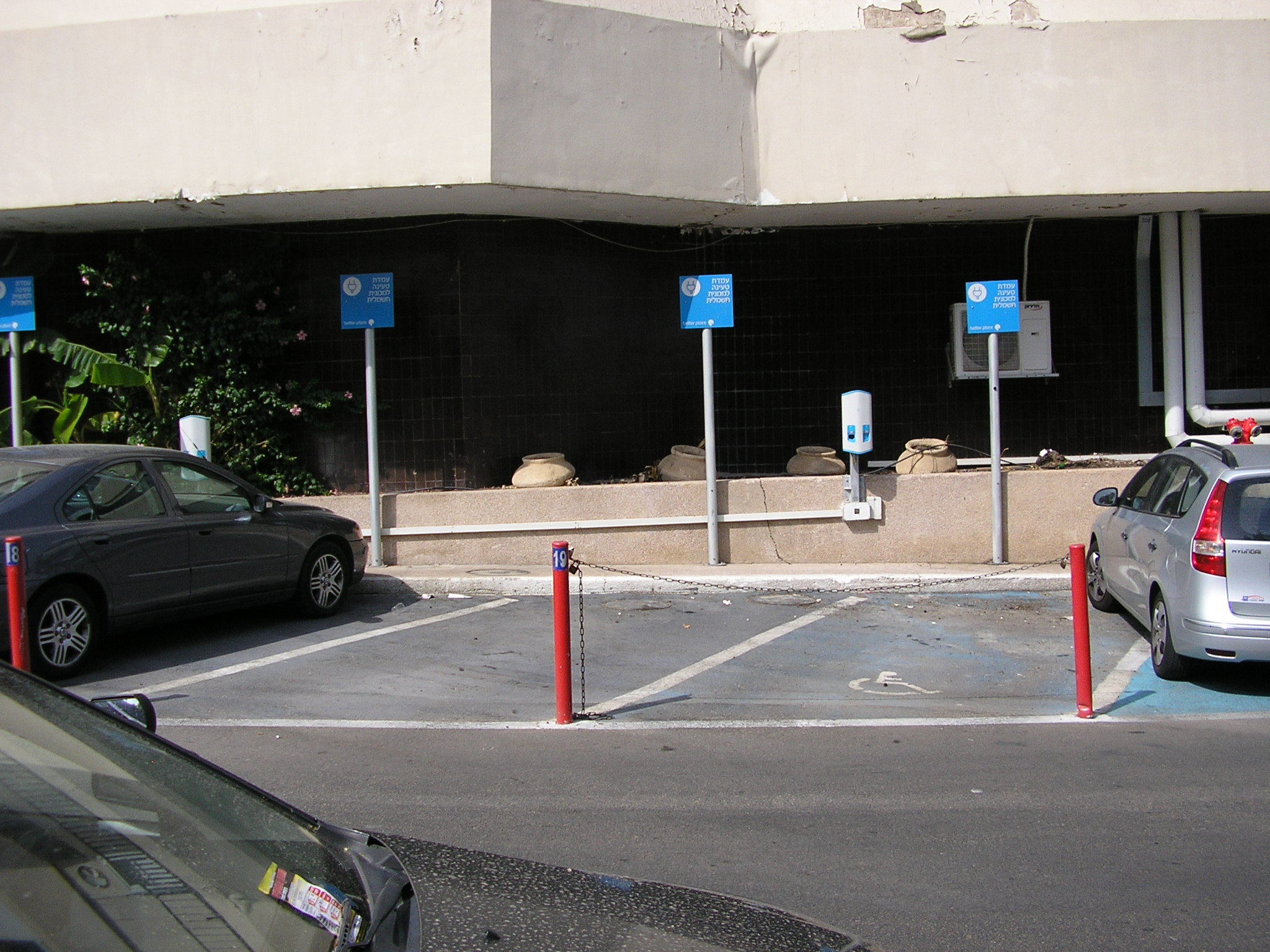
Better Place charging stations outside the Leonardo Club Hotel in Tiberias.

Israel was the first nation in the world to partner with Better Place to build an electric car infrastructure. Shai Agassi, former Better Place CEO, claimed that by 2016, plus or minus a year, more than 50% of cars sold in Israel would be electric.

Battery switch stations were supposedly opening to customers almost weekly in 2012. That map indicates with "orange circles" the handful of battery switch stations available in June 2012, and shows with "grey circles" the full buildout of battery switch stations expected by year's end. The Baran Group signed an agreement with Better Place stating its intention to build 51 battery switch stations over the course of 2011 to cover all of Israel. However progress was not nearly as rapid as was planned.

According to the Financial Times around 400 corporations in Israel signed letters of intent to begin switching their fleets to Better Place electric car network as soon as the service becomes available. This represented a potential of 80,000 electric cars. Out of the 100,000 Renault Fluence Z.E. that Better Place agreed to buy from Renault, the company claimed to have already signed around 70,000 orders, most of them from commercial fleet customers.

Better Place launched its first battery-swapping station in Israel, in Kiryat Ekron, near Rehovot in March 2011. The station was supposed to be the first of approximately 40 stations to begin operating in the near term. The battery exchange process took five minutes. The company also erected over 1,000 functional charging spots for the cars and thousands more were supposed to be put in place by the end of 2011, according to the CEO of Better Place Israel.

Orders for the Renault Fluence ZE in Israel began in July 2011. According to Better Place, their customers regular maintenance costs would be about 40% less than for regular family cars, insurance also will be less at around NIS 3,700 a year, and its comprehensive solution of electric car and services would cut annual vehicle maintenance costs by 20%.

The first deliveries of the Renault Fluence Z.E. took place on 22 January 2012 and around 100 electric cars were allocated to Better Place's employees. Better Place planned a staged delivery process as the infrastructure across the country was completed. Retail customer deliveries began in the second quarter of 2012. As of mid September 2012, there were 21 operational battery-swap stations open to the public in Israel. Cumulative sales through July 2012 reached 300 cars, and as of the end of October, just 490 cars had been sold, making the company's target of 4,000 customers by June 2013 a difficult goal to achieve. In October 2012, Better Place signed a deal with Elco to supply 125 cars worth NIS 15m. The 125 Renault Fluence ZEs were to be delivered through 2012 and 2013. As of December 2012, a total of 518 cars were sold in the country. In the first four months of 2013, a total 422 cars were sold, bringing the total to 940. Alan Gelman, chief financial officer said in January 2013 that the company had turned a corner in recent weeks with large sales to fleets and that the days of not selling cars were over Nevertheless, on 26 May 2013 the company filed for bankruptcy in Israel.

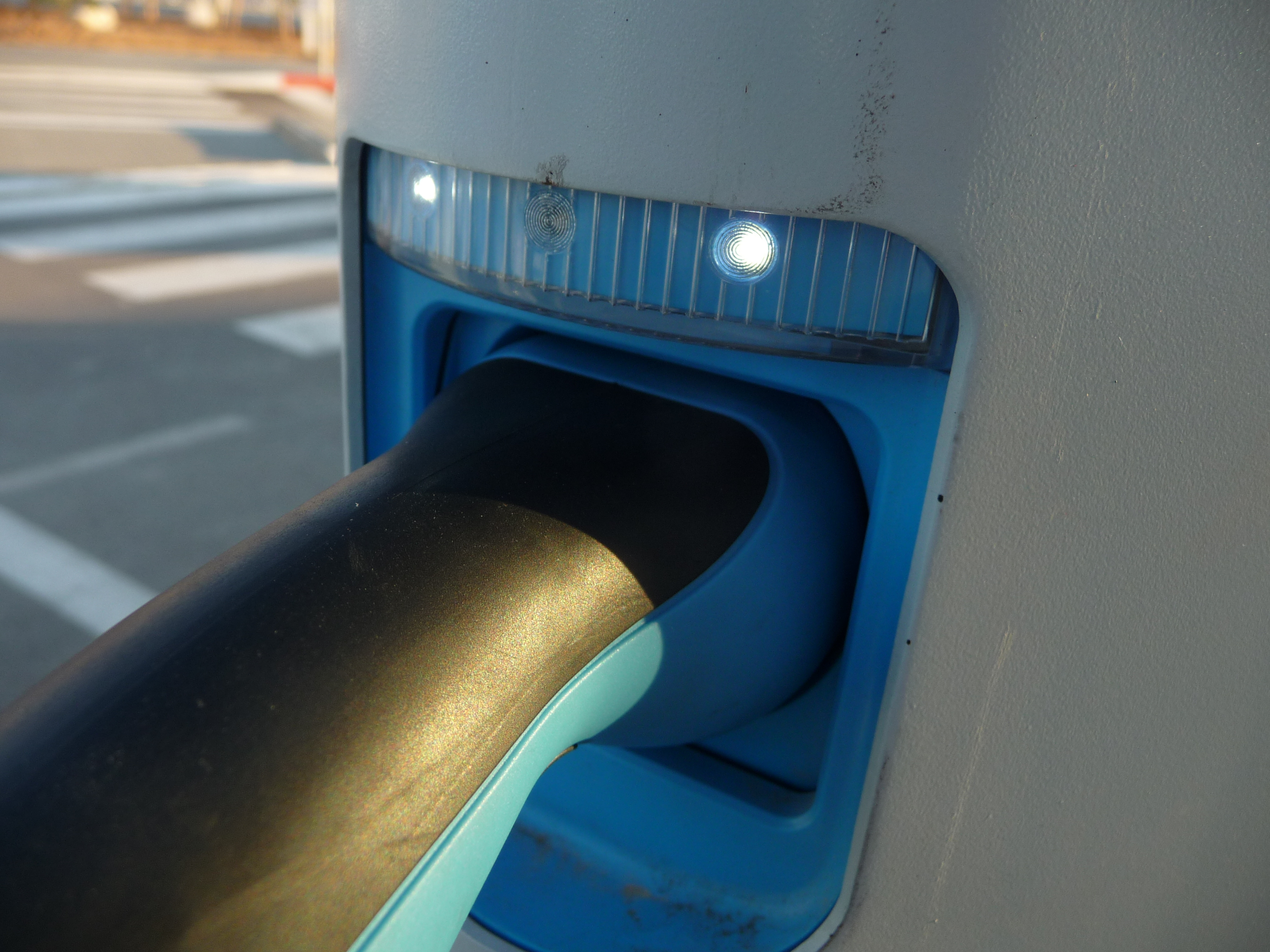
Charging spot in Israel

==== Customer qualifications ====
Better Place wanted electric car customers who could make a successful transition from range anxiety to ordinary range awareness within the company's growing infrastructure. During the sales process, Better Place aimed to educate and assess each customer's electric car suitability. The company was going to exclude drivers frequently traveling irregular routes that span the country. Eventually, Israel was supposed to have enough battery switch stations and recharging spots at parking garages, shopping centers, hotels, commercial areas, and elsewhere, to cater for most drivers.

At minimum, customers needed dedicated off-road parking at home and, for higher mileage drivers, Better Place was going to install charging spots at people's workplace. The preferred high-mileage customer might commute 130-kilometre (81 mi) each way between home and office. Lower distance customers might only need their home charging spot, with battery switching being infrequent.

==== Israel electric grid ====
Better Place charging stations were to have smart grid interactivity that automatically time-shifted the charging process away from peak electrical demand hours. Most critics claimed it was an attempt to monopolize the charging of car batteries, and had in fact the reverse effect, which discouraged many potential customers in Israel from buying Better Place's cars.

== Awards ==
Edmunds.com selected battery-charging infrastructure developers Coulomb Technologies and Better Place as recipients of its first annual Green Car Breakthrough Award. In 2010, Shai Agassi was included at number 28 in a list of the 100 Top Global Thinkers published by Foreign Policy magazine, for his efforts to make electric cars a mass-market success.

== Similar projects ==
A number of companies have announced plans to install charging station networks. In France, Électricité de France (EDF) and Toyota announced plans to provide recharging points for PHEVs on roads, streets and parking lots. EDF also announced a partnership with Elektromotive, Ltd. to install 250 new charging points over six months from October 2007 in London and elsewhere in the UK. Coulomb Technologies was aiming to deploy its ChargePoint charging station network throughout the USA.

In March 2009, Tesla Motors announced a partnership to deploy battery swap stations among their existing Supercharger network to service their Model S platform cars. Tesla abandoned battery swapping citing low demand.

The Nation-E's Angel Car system is a portable unit, containing a lithium-ion battery, that stores energy and is used as an emergency charger for electric cars that run out of power. It designed to be a solution to "range anxiety" without the deployment of extensive new infrastructure, and provides fast-charging services for all known Evs equipped with a fast-charging socket, including hybrid cars.

On 22nd June 2026 Octopus Energy announced "Swaptopus" in a partnership with CATL to swap batteries for electric trucks with the first swapping station due online in 2027.

== See also ==
- Battery electric vehicle
- Charging station
- Electric car
- Electric car use by country
- EV Project
- List of modern production plug-in electric vehicles
- Plug-in electric vehicle
- Tesla Motors
- Renault Fluence Z.E.
- Shai Agassi
- Vehicle-to-grid
