= Switching station =

The term switching station may refer to:

- an electrical substation, with only one voltage level, whose only function are switching actions.
- a battery switch station, such as the ones used by the Better Place network.
- a railroad switching station.
- a telephone switching station.
