= ECOtality =

Former technology company

ECOtality, Inc.
- Type: Clean electric transportation and storage technologies
- Traded as: OTCID Basic: ECTYQ
- Industry: Renewable energy Hybrid vehicle Vehicle inspection Consulting
- Founded: Phoenix, Arizona (Electric Transportation Applications 1989, ETEC 1996)
- Founder: Don Karner – ETA/ETEC, Kevin Morrow – ETEC, founders
- Fate: bankruptcy
- Headquarters: San Francisco, California, USA
- Area served: Worldwide
- Products: Charging infrastructure
- Number of employees: 32
- Website: ECOtality, Inc.

ECOtality, Inc., headquartered in San Francisco, California, was an electric transportation and storage technologies company. ECOtality was the parent company of ECOtality North America, Innergy Power Corporation, Fuel Cell Store and ECOtality Australia Pty Ltd.

Ecotality, Inc. was a provider of electric transportation and storage technologies. The Company provided electric vehicle infrastructure products and solutions that are used in on-road, grid-connected vehicles (including plug-in hybrid electric vehicles (PHEV) and battery electric vehicles), material handling and airport electric ground support applications. Through its main operating subsidiary, Electric Transportation Engineering Corporation (eTec), the company's primary product offering was the Minit-Charger line of advanced battery fast-charge systems that are designed for various motive applications. In addition to its electric transportation focus, Ecotality, Inc. was also involved in the development, manufacture, assembly and sale of specialty solar products, advanced battery systems, and hydrogen and fuel cell systems. Its subsidiaries and primary operating segments consisted of eTec, Innergy Power Corporation (Innergy), and ECOtality Stores (doing business as Fuel Cell Store).

On September 16, 2013, it filed for bankruptcy protection under Chapter 11, Title 11, United States Code. In October 2013, the Car Charging Group, Inc. announced that it had purchased Ecotality's Blink network of charging stations for $3.3 million. Two Ecotality branches—Minit-Charger and Etec Labs—were not included in the purchase: Minit-Charger manufactures quick-charging systems for commercial applications, and Etec Labs conducts tests for the government and OEMs. They were purchased by Access Control and Intertek, respectively.

== EV Project ==
ECOtality North America (formerly eTec), a wholly owned subsidiary of ECOtality, was awarded $99.9M from the American Recovery and Reinvestment Act of 2009 by the United States Department of Energy for The EV Project.

Officially launched in October 2009, The EV Project is an infrastructure study, the focus of which is to examine various situations involving EV drivers and charging infrastructure.

== Charging stations ==
ECOtality sells electric vehicle supply equipment (EVSE) through its customer-facing brand of smart electric vehicle chargers, Blink. The Blink line of chargers includes Level 2 AC Wall Mount chargers, Level 2 AC Pedestal chargers, and Level 2 DC Fast Chargers. The Blink Network encompasses the Blink line of charging stations, as well as the Blink mobile app and website, where customers can access personal charging statistics, charger maps, and account information.

== Partnerships ==
ECOtality has announced partnerships with several retail hosts who will install Blink chargers, several of which are partnered as part of The EV Project. Partners include: Idaho National Laboratory, Oak Ridge National Laboratory, IKEA USA, Fred Meyer, Arco/BP, Macy's, Cracker Barrel, San Diego Gas & Electric, and more.

In 2011, ECOtality announced that it would partner with ABB, who invested $10 million into the company to develop EV initiatives in North America.

ECOtality also announced a partnership with Jones Lang LaSalle in 2011, in an effort to identify additional commercial retail hosts for the installation of Blink chargers.

Collaboratev is a joint project between ECOtality and ChargePoint.

== Innergy Power Corporation ==
Innergy Power Corporation designs and manufactures thin sealed lead batteries and high-quality flat-panel multicrystalline PV solar modules. In addition, Innergy is developing EV battery technology and designing/building battery packs in SLA, NiMH and Li chemistries.

== Fuel Cell Store ==
Founded in Boulder, Colorado in 1999, Fuel Cell Store is a provider of information, educational products, and services related to the fuel cell industry. Fuel Cell Store was purchased out of the ECOtality bankruptcy in late 2013 and moved to College Station, Texas where it continues to operate and grow as the world's largest and oldest online retailer of fuel cell components.
