= Tsahi Merkur =

Israeli businessman (born 1976)

- צחי מרקור
- Born: Tsahi Merkur; 1976 (age 49–50)
- Occupation: President
- Known for: Founding Success Group

Tsahi Merkur (Hebrew: צחי מרקור; born 1976) is an Israeli businessman. He serves as chairman of the Israel Parking Association on behalf of the Chamber of Commerce.

== Biography ==
Merkur studied at Ort Singalovski School, majoring in computers and electronics.

== Business career ==
Merkur was among the first to incorporate commercial advertisements on the Internet, and did so even before Google and Facebook. Merkur is the owner of a large international group that invests in hi-tech, internet, real estate, retail, hotel, energy, advertising, bio-acoustics and electric transportation.

In 1999, Merkur founded the parking company, the “Parking Giant”, and later "Success parking", "Reit Parking" as well as other parking companies.

In 2005, Success Parking began to operate public parking lots. In 2005, the company won a tender for the operation of the five largest parking lots in Tel Aviv of "Ahuzot HaHof", for the duration of two years. As of 2013, the number of parking lots and facilities owned and operated by " Success Parking" stands at approximately one hundred.

In 2008, Merkur acquired from Yitzhak Tshuva, through Success Parking, a portfolio of nine parking facilities in the cities of Tel Aviv, Netanya, Petah Tikva and Jerusalem with 2,000 parking spaces for about 40 million NIS. Success Parking revenue for 2009 was more than $200 million. In 2010, Merkur attempted to acquire a controlling share of Azorim Investment, Development and Construction.

Merkur owns real estate businesses that are partly used for vehicles parking through the "Success Assets" company, which has five branches: " Success Parking Ltd." (the largest parking lot franchise owned by him, which focuses mainly on parking lots in Tel Aviv), "Reit Parking Ltd.", Bareket Investments and Parking Ltd.", “Bezeq Parking Ltd." (for one parking lot) and "Neta Parking Ltd. ".

In March 2018, he sold a parking facility in Netanya for about 24 million NIS, having bought it only a year earlier at 6.5 million NIS. Among other things, he sold the portfolio bought from Yitzhak Tshuva for NIS 40 million, as individual parking facilities at a total sales price of about 140 million NIS, at the timeline of approximately only 3 years. One of the parking facilities is the Shtamper parking facility in Netanya, which has 79 parking spaces, which Merkur sold for NIS 13 Million, a sales price that comes to NIS 164,500 per parking space, which broke a record in Israel for a public parking facility.

In August 2018, Merkur entered a partnership with the British energy company Centrica.

He is also the founder of the National Centre for Charity and Aid for those in Need.

== Investments in start-ups ==
=== AppliCure ===
AppliCure is a company that develops, manufactures and markets software products for a network environment (Internet and intranet), and its flagship product is a software named dotDefender, which secures a variety of platforms and web-based applications. The company was founded in 2004 by Moshe Bassol (who served as CEO until 2010) and David Alush.

In 2007, AppliCure was listed for trading on the Tel Aviv Stock Exchange, at a company value of NIS 42 million. The company raised NIS 11 Million on the stock exchange, but presented losses, and soon thereafter the company lost its worth. In the reports of the fourth quarter of 2007, it already became clear that the financing round was almost exhausted, and the company was required to raise additional capital. The British fund Trafalgar Capital supported the company, but AppliCure was unable to recover from its losses, and ended the first quarter of 2009 with a "Going Concern Warning" notice in its reports.

In July 2009, the control interest in the company (70%) was sold to the Nika Group, which was under the control of Merkur, for NIS 8 million In the first quarter of 2010, the company had become profitable for the first time in its history. The Nika Group was established and managed by Tsahi Merkur (who was appointed Chairman of the AppliCure Board of Directors), Eli Hakam, and Fruition (formerly No Risk Ltd. 2004). The company operates a number of business models, including SaaS (Software as a Service) and the sale of licenses. The company has approximately 1,500 subscribers and customers who have purchased licenses for the system, Dot-Defender.

=== DRiiVZ ===
In 2011, Merkur founded the start-up DRiiVZ, which aims to manage charging stations for electric vehicles. The company has developed a platform for online cloud management and billing. In this framework it provides solutions and software for infrastructure and charging stations for hybrid and electric vehicles and also the management and streamlining of smart energy projects.

In 2013, the management system of DRiiVZ was announced by the Dutch Elaad Fund as the world's leading management system of all the systems examined by it. The E-laad Foundation has the largest public charging network in Europe and is the founder of the global consortium OCCP, which integrates private and public companies that are leading the field of charging infrastructure for electric cars. DRiiVZ has also developed an online vehicle management platform called Vehicle-to-Grid, which enables network management of power transmission from electric vehicles to power grids, including technology that supports energy efficiency. DRiiVZ has integrated projects with leading energy companies and is active throughout Europe, America and Australia.

DRiiVZ serves hundreds of thousands of electric vehicle drivers worldwide. It won a world competition in February 2018 and was recognized as the most innovative electric transport company in the world. The announcement came after DRiiVZ competed with 450 companies from 51 countries, surveyed by the Free Electron International Association, which integrates the largest energy companies in the world.

According to Merkur, who believes that by 2030 most of the cars sold in the world will be electric, including autonomous vehicles that travel independently without a driver.

In August 2018, Merkur has entered into a partnership with the British energy company Centrica, which is traded and listed on the FTSE 100 on the London Stock Exchange and counts among its holdings British Gas, Scottish Power, Bord Gais Energy and many additional holdings, and has invested in Driivz, which Merkur still controls. Centrica is a multi-national British energy company that provides electricity, gas and various services to tens of millions of consumers.

Centrica Innovation has joined up with the London investment fund, Ombu Group, which specializes in investment in advanced technology companies, and together they led an investment round that raised $12 million in Driivz.

== National Centre for Charity and Aid for those in Need ==
Merkur initiated and founded the National Centre for Charity and Aid for those in Need, which operates voluntarily and with the funding of Merkur. Its purpose is to increase the scope of donations for the people in need and for non-profit organizations in Israel, and to improve the transparency of the fundraising organizations in Israel.

In addition, a charity fund was established in order to assist struggling populations, especially sick children and homeless people. As part of the project, an innovative global donation system is being developed that will improve the level of transparency and the efficiency of charity organizations and foundations, and will enable the increase in the amount of donations that can be raised by non-profit organizations and charities, that manage to channel the donations to them in the best possible manner for the ultimate goal for which the donors initially intended to contribute, and also directly to those in need who will be able to reach the hearts of the donors .

== Better Place ==
Better Place is an international operation of electric vehicles established by Shai Agassi and Idan Ofer, chairman of the Israel Corporation. After failing to raise additional funds, Better Place requested the court to appoint a liquidator, and in July 2013 the court approved the recommendation of the temporary liquidators to sell the company's activity and assets in Israel to the Sunrise group for NIS 18 Million. and without payment of an advance payment.

At the end of August 2013, the temporary liquidators appealed to the court to cancel the sale to the Sunrise group, and to sell the activity to Success Assets. However, this sale as well was cancelled at the request of the liquidators, out of a series of 4 consecutive sales transactions that were cancelled for four different buyers. Merkur appealed to the Supreme Court to cancel the decision to cancel the transaction, but until the appeal was heard in March 2014, the company's assets were already sold in parts, and there was no longer any reason to hear the appeal while the sale could not be re-established. The Supreme Court ruled that Merkur's Success Assets were entitled to compensation for the cancellation of the transaction.
