= ChargePoint =

American EV infrastructure company

ChargePoint Holdings, Inc.
- Type: Public
- Traded as: NYSE: CHPT; Russell 2000 component
- Industry: Electric vehicle infrastructure
- Founded: 2007; 19 years ago
- Headquarters: Campbell, California, U.S.
- Key people: Rick Wilmer (CEO); Bruce Chizen (chairman)
- Products: Electric vehicle chargers
- Revenue: ▲US$507 million (2024)
- Operating income: ▼US$−450 million (2024)
- Net income: ▼US$−458 million (2024)
- Total assets: ▲US$1.10 billion (2024)
- Total equity: ▼US$328 million (2024)
- Number of employees: 1,650 (2024)
- Website: chargepoint.com
- Footnotes; Financials as of January 31, 2024.

ChargePoint Holdings, Inc. (formerly Coulomb Technologies) is an American electric vehicle infrastructure company based in Campbell, California. ChargePoint operates the largest online network of independently owned EV charging stations operating in 14 countries and makes some of its technology.

== History ==
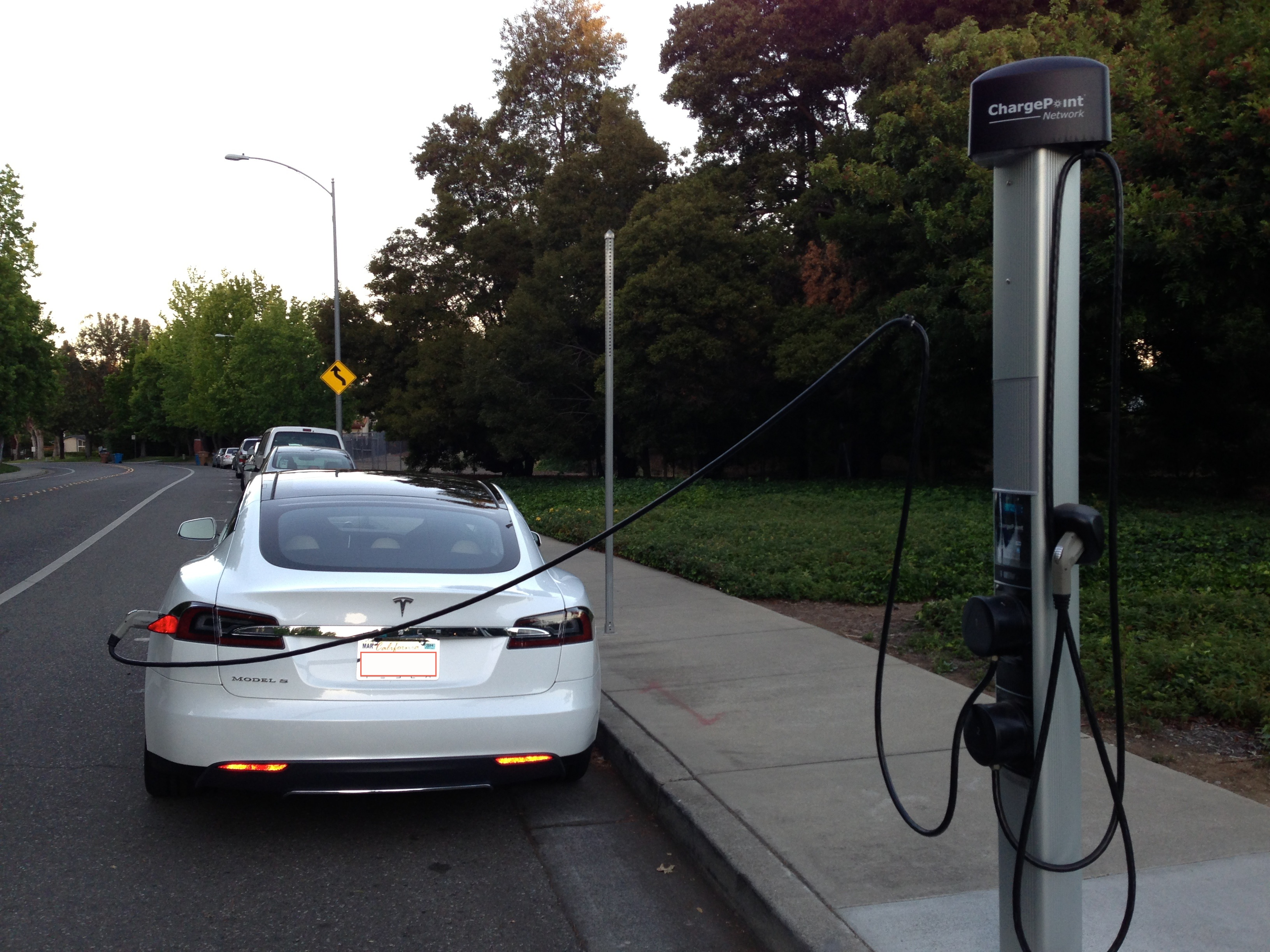
A ChargePoint public charging station at the Hillsboro Civic Center in Hillsboro, Oregon.

ChargePoint was founded in 2007 as Coulomb Technologies by Richard Lowenthal, Dave Baxter and Harjinder Bhade.

In June 2017, ChargePoint took over 9,800 electric vehicle charging spots from GE, adding to its 34,900 existing charging stations across Mexico, Australia, Canada, and the United States.

On November 28, 2018, ChargePoint raised $240 million. At the time, ChargePoint maintained 57,000 charging stations. In 2019, VW's Electrify America and ChargePoint agreed to provide common access to their US customers.

The company reached 100,000 chargers in September 2019, while adding more than 2,000 charging locations per month.

ChargePoint went public through a special-purpose acquisition company ("SPAC") reverse merger in February 2021. In January 2023, ChargePoint, Mercedes-Benz, and MN8 Energy announced plans to add 2,500 fast chargers at 400 charging hubs in the U.S., available to all EVs.

| Date | Number of spots | % Growth |
|---|---|---|
| June 2017 | 35,900 | — |
| July 2018 | 47,000 | +31.0% |
| September 2018 | 53,000 | +12.8% |
| November 2018 | 57,000 | +7.5% |
| January 2019 | 58,000 | +1.8% |
| June 2019 | 65,000 | +12.1% |
| September 2019 | 100,000 | +53.8% |
| November 2019 | 103,700 | +3.7% |
| September 2020 | 114,000 | +9.9% |
| March 2022 | 174,000 | +52.6% |
| January 2023 | 225,000 | +29.3% |
| January 2024 | 286,000 | +27.1% |
| January 2025 | 342,000 | +19.6% |

== Charging stations ==
The company "designs, develops and manufactures hardware and software solutions" for electric vehicles at large.

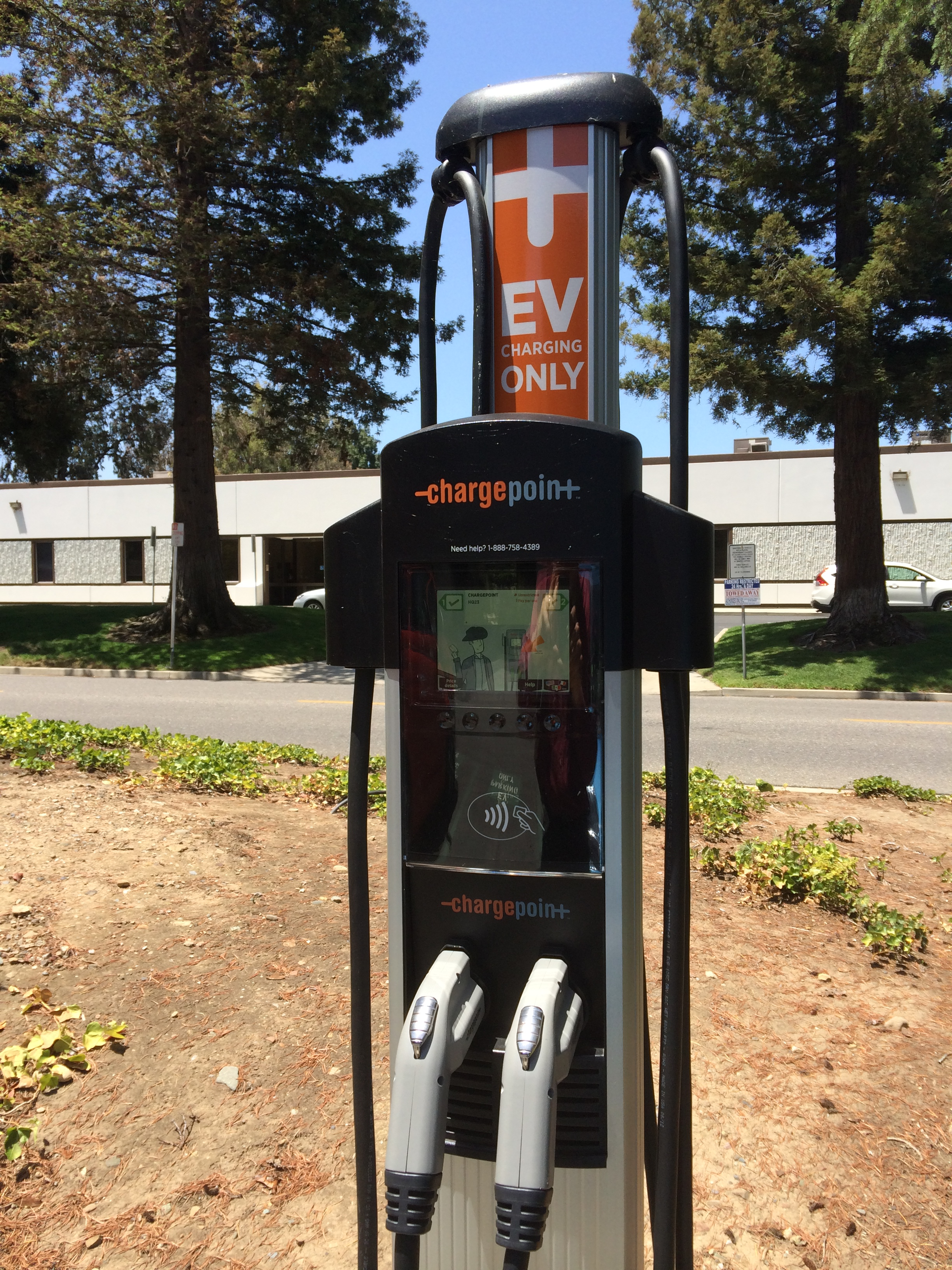
ChargePoint CT4000 family intelligent dual port networked Electric Vehicle charging station with driver services, mobile and web apps

ChargePoint Home – This small home charger won an Edison Award for new product innovation and human-centered design. It is available in 16A and 32A versions. ChargePoint Home Flex added 50A charging support.

CT4000 Family – The CT4000 is intended for property owners, businesses and municipalities providing for charging stations for their employees, customers, residents and fleets. It was the first to support power sharing along multiple ports.

CP4000 Family – Three phase Mennekes ("type 2") charging for Europe, up to 22 kW. Can share a single three phase 63A circuit or use two separate 32A circuits.

CPE 100 and CPE 200 – ChargePoint Express DC fast chargers offer fast charging for most DC-capable electric vehicles. With an embedded AC-to-DC converter, they directly charge the vehicle battery and can charge some EVs in less than 30 minutes. Express stations are particularly suitable for short dwell time parking, freeway corridor locations and quick turnaround fleet charging. They can also be installed in workplaces to complement CT4000 stations for employees who need a quick charge. Express 100 is 24 kW, Express 200 is 50 kW, and Express 250 is 62.5 kW. Express 100 is available in separate CCS and CHAdeMO models, while Express 200 is larger and has both ports. Express 200 is a charging design licensed from Tritium.

CPF25 Family – The CPF25 is designed for select fleet and multi-family applications. For fleets, CPF25 stations are suited for depot charging. For multi-family communities, CPF25 stations are intended for personal charging in assigned parking spots. CPF32 is a European Type 2 version (still limited to single phase 32A charging). The CPF50 added 50A charging support.

ChargePoint Express Plus Family – The liquid-cooled, modular 400 kW charging system called "Express Plus" was launched in January 2017 at CES in Las Vegas, Nevada.

=== Obsolete stations ===
- CT1000 – NEMA 5-15 outlet behind a door, ChargePoint's first station. It is rare, with most having been upgraded to the CT2100.
- CT1500 – 220 V 16 A outlets behind a door. Can be Schuko, BS 1363, or Australian outlets.
- CT2000 – Single J1772.
- CT2100 – J1772 and NEMA 5-20 charging on separate circuits.
- CT2500 – Mennekes (IEC 62196) charging (single phase).
- CT2020 family – Dual J1772 on separate circuits (no power sharing support).
- CT500 – Small home charger (J1772), replaced by ChargePoint Home.
- CT3000 – 50 kW CHAdeMO fast charging

== Gallery ==
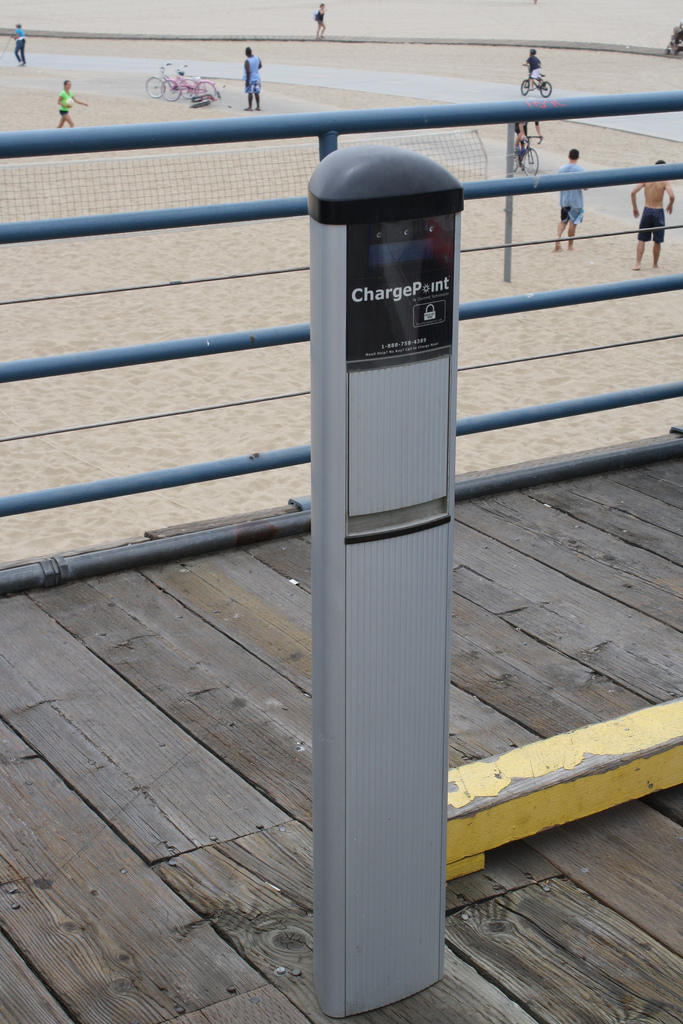
Santa Monica Pier, California

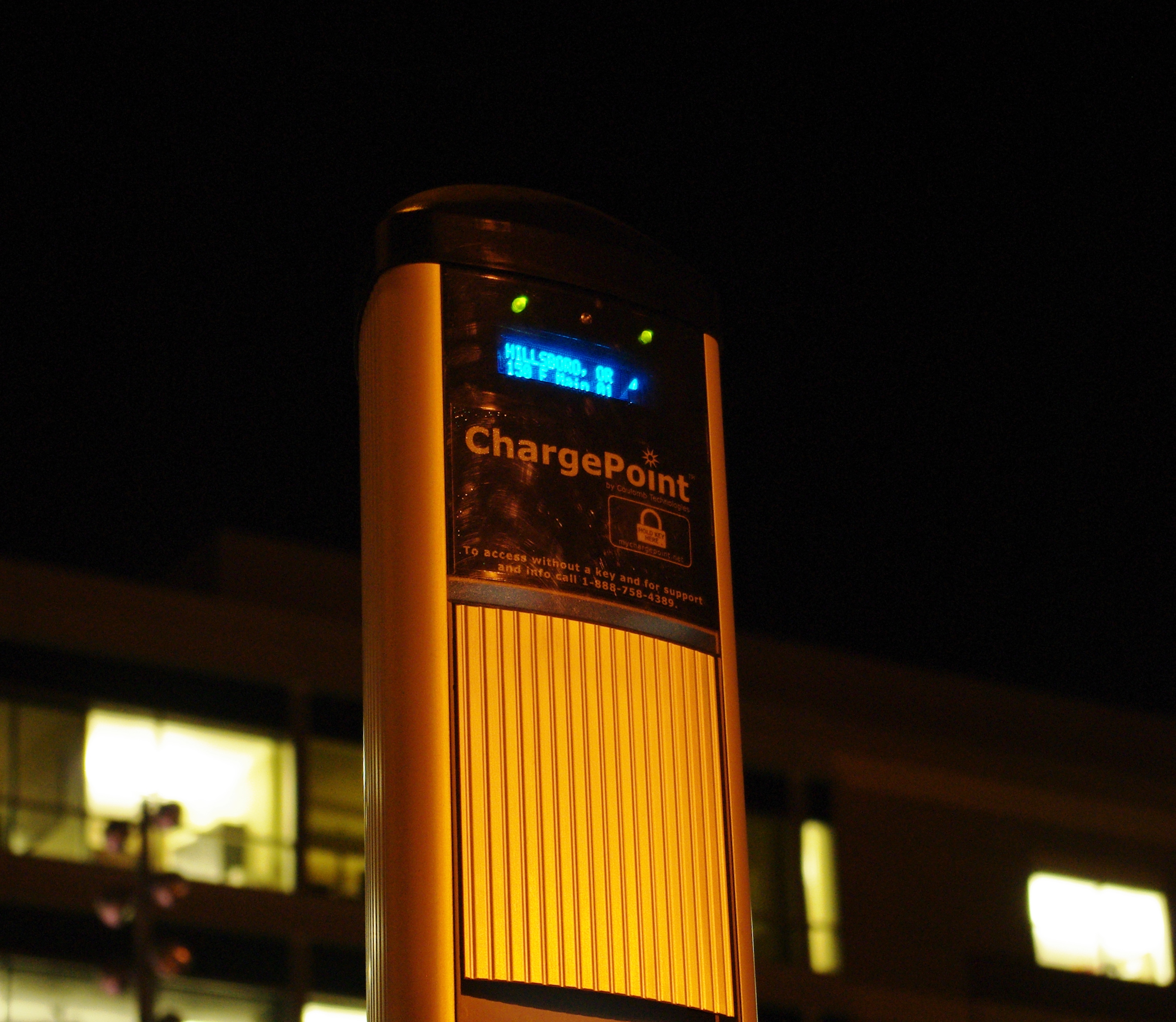
Hillsboro, Oregon

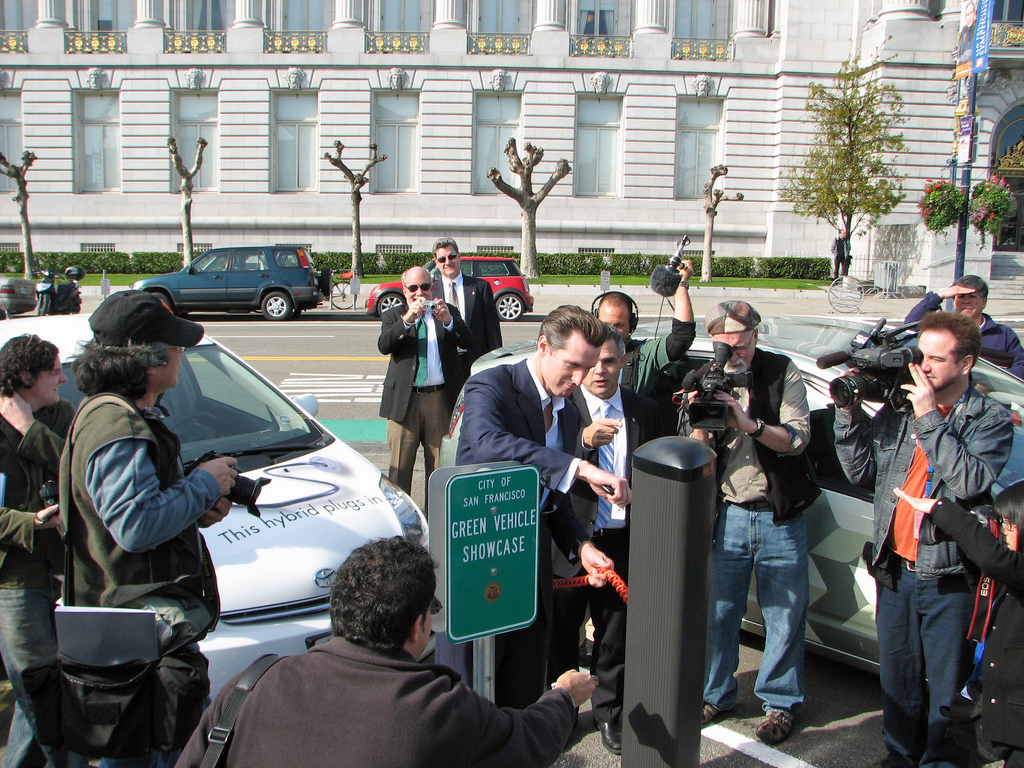
San Francisco

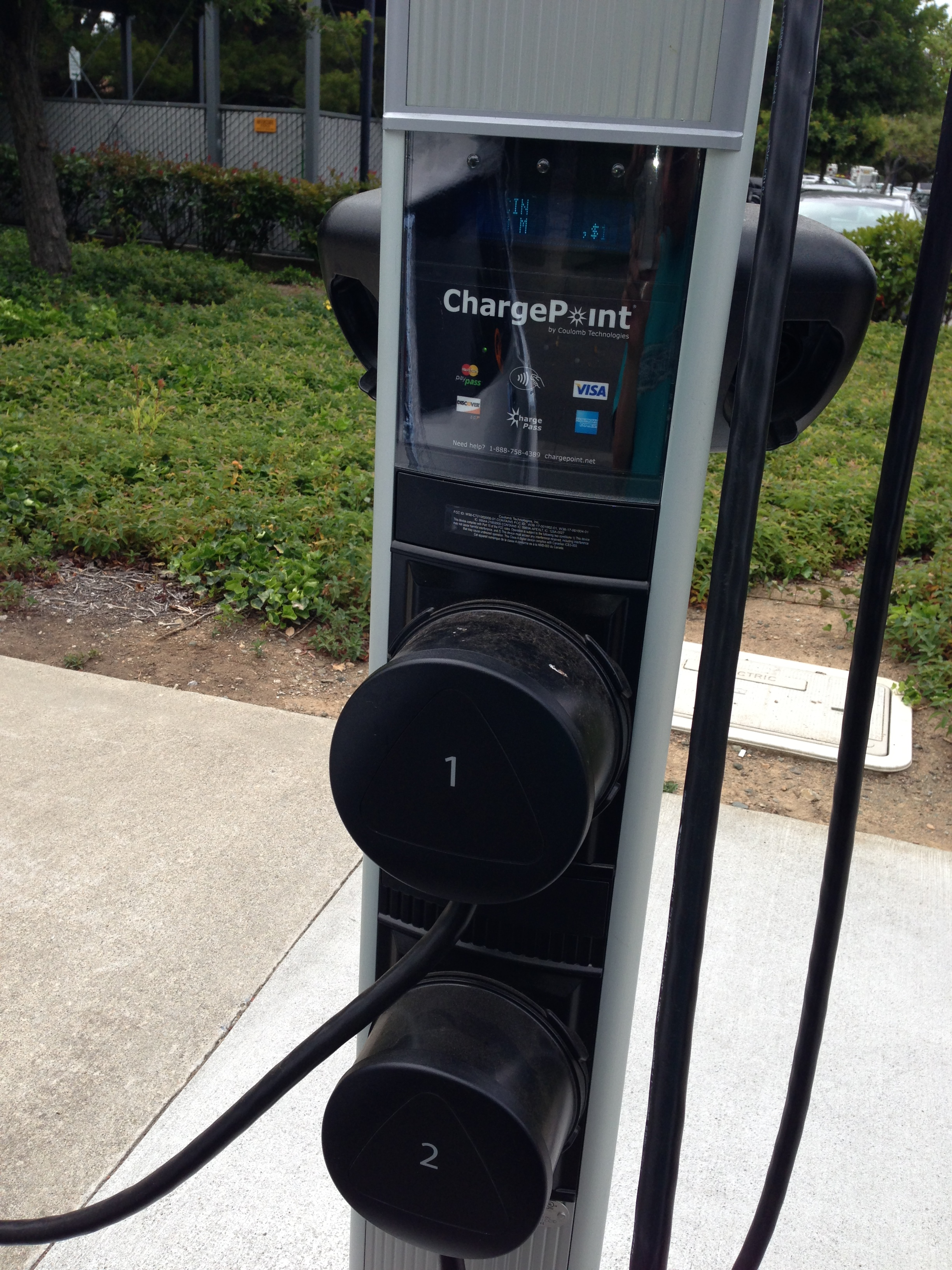
ChargePoint charging station in California

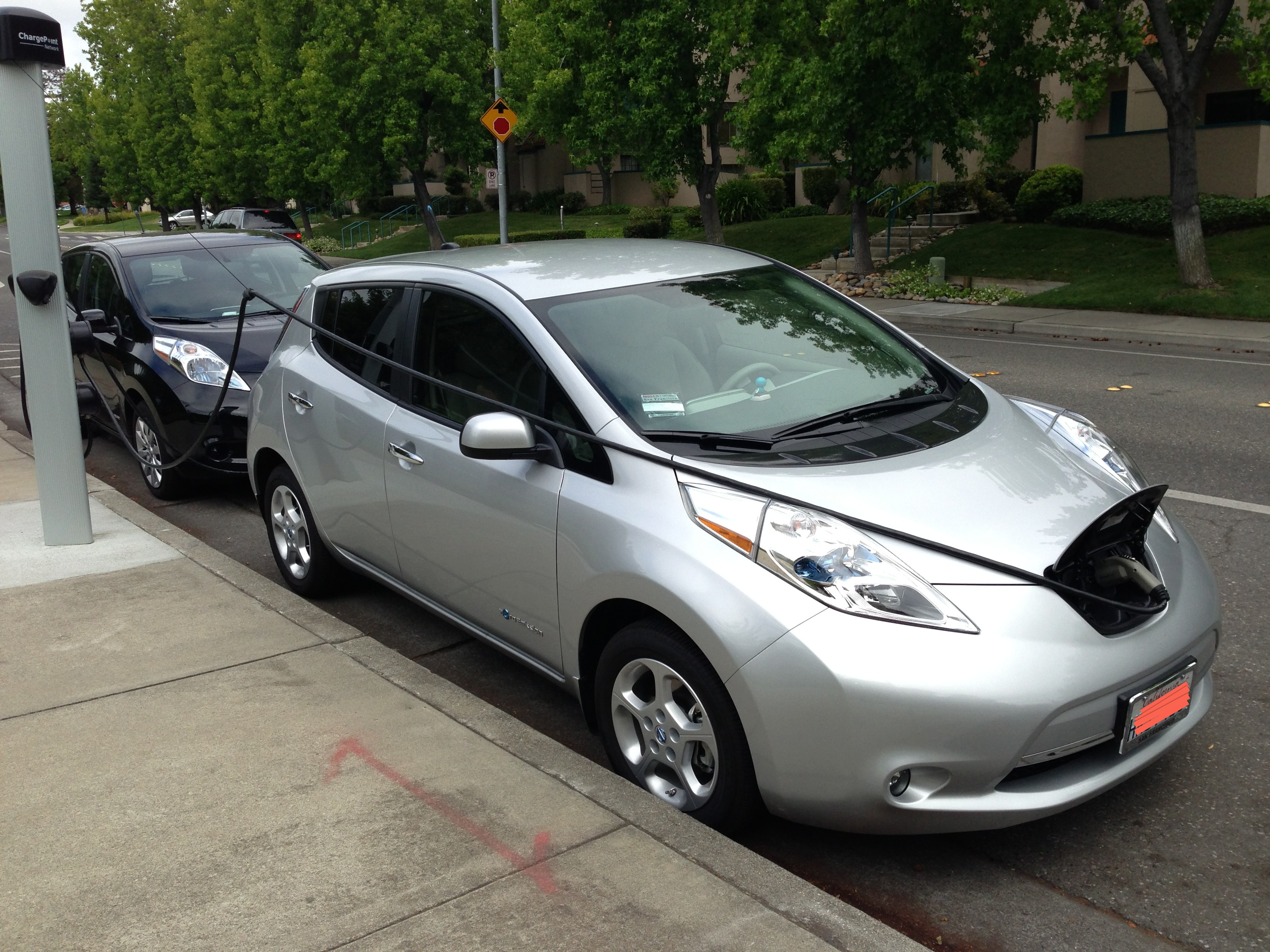
Nissan Leaf charging

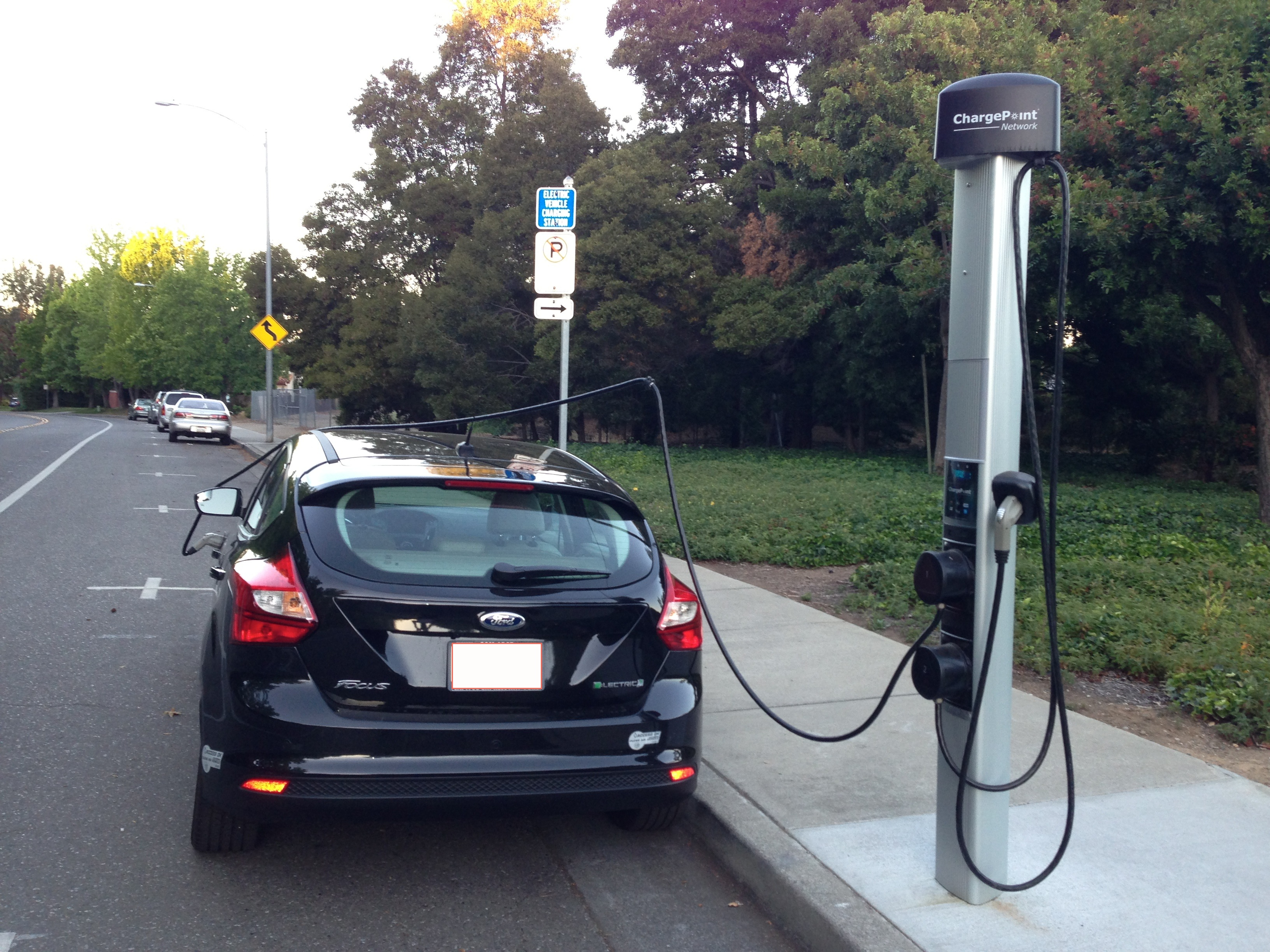
Ford Focus being charged on a roadside ChargePoint station.

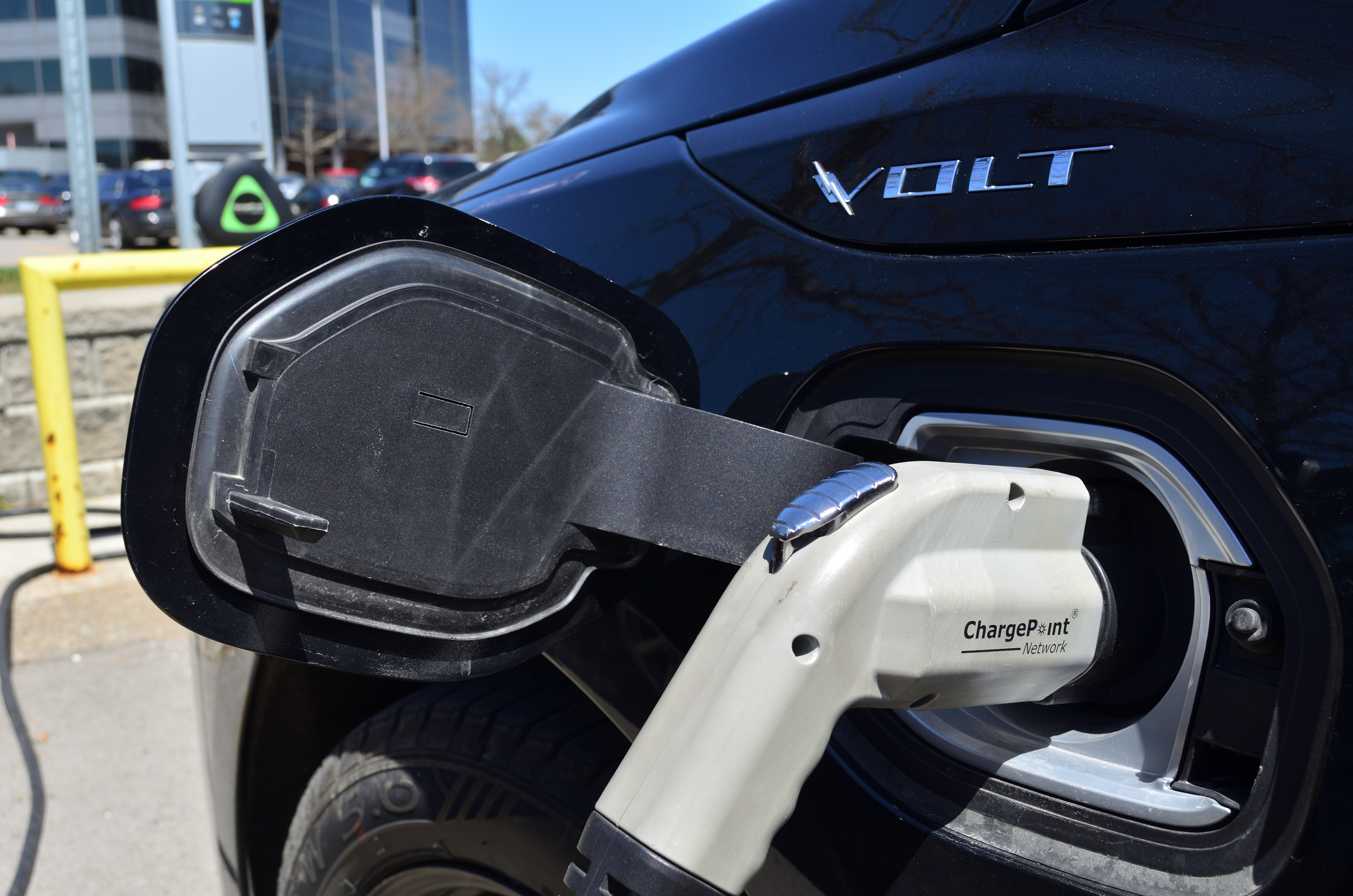
Chevrolet Volt being charged at a ChargePoint station.

== See also ==
- Plug-in electric vehicle – Type of vehicle
- Plug-in hybrid vehicle – Hybrid vehicle with externally chargeable battery
- EVgo – American electric vehicle charging company
