= Harris Ranch Airport =

- IATA: none; ICAO: none; FAA LID: 3O8

Summary
- Airport type: Public
- Owner/Operator: Harris Ranch Beef Company
- Location: Coalinga, California
- Elevation AMSL: 470 ft (140 m)
- Coordinates: 36°14′53.2″N 120°14′18.5″W
- Website: https://www.harrisranch.com
- Interactive map of Harris Ranch Airport

Runways
Direction	Length		Surface
Direction	ft	m	Surface
14/32	2,820	860	Asphalt

Harris Ranch Airport (FAA LID: 3O8) is an airstrip near Coalinga, California, next to Interstate 5. To the north of the airport is the Harris Ranch Restaurant and Inn. The airport has been open since March 1981.

There is only one runway, 30 feet (9.1 m) wide and 2,820 feet (860 m) long. Parking and fuel are on the north end near the restaurant. On the south end of the runway is a run-up area. There is no taxiway parallel to the runway, so takeoffs on RWY32 and landings on RWY14 require back-taxi on the runway.

== Uses ==
An average of 27 operations per day occur at Harris Ranch. All are transient general aviation flights; no aircraft are based there. One of the most common uses of this airport is to access the Harris Ranch restaurant and/or hotel (see: $100 hamburger).
