= Gogoro Smartscooter =

Series of Taiwanese electric scooters

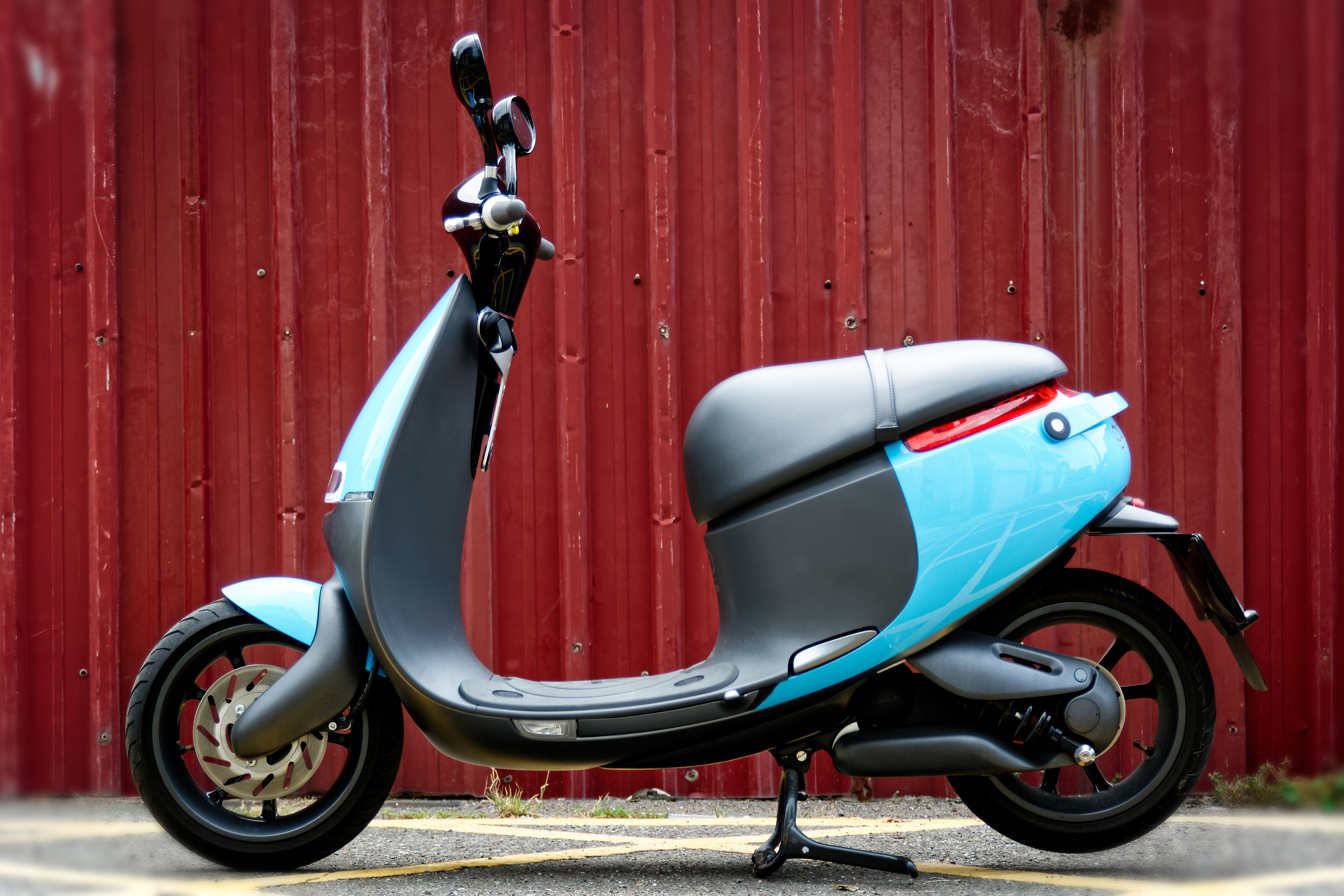
Gogoro 1 Series Plus

The Gogoro Smartscooter is a series of electric scooters developed by Gogoro and marketed starting in 2015, using an aluminum chassis and a liquid cooled permanent magnet synchronous traction motor. It uses a battery swapping scheme, branded Gogoro Network, to recharge its traction batteries; users pay a monthly subscription fee, the exact value of which depends on their expected usage, to gain access to the company's GoStation public battery dispensing machines. Although at-home charging is possible, starting with the 2 Series scooters released in 2017, owners still are required to pay a monthly subscription fee for Gogoro Network access.

The scooter design integrates sensors that collect information such as speed, energy consumption and levels, system failures, as well as scooter falls. The information is relayed to the Gogoro Energy Network and presented to riders via Gogoro mobile apps compatible with Android and IOS smartphones. The Gogoro mobile app also allows for customization of certain settings such as lighting and sound profiles.

== Gogoro Scooter models ==
The Gogoro Smartscooter has been marketed with multiple models grouped into several different series. The 1 Series was a retronym applied after the 2 Series was introduced in 2017. The 3 Series was aimed at the mid-priced market upon its introduction in 2019, but it was replaced in that market segment by the more affordable Viva Mix, introduced in 2021; the Viva XL uses the 3 Series chassis rather than the Viva Mix. The Viva was Gogoro's lowest-priced Smartscooter when it was introduced in 2019, and Gogoro have since introduced an even more affordable model, the JEGO, in 2024. Between those dates, Gogoro have introduced the CrossOver series, which they bill as a "2-wheeled SUV", and the flagship Pulse, on model-specific chassis.

=== Series ===
Physical characteristics of Gogoro scooter series
Dim. Series	Intro.	Disc.	Length	Width	Height	Wheelbase	Weight (with/ without batteries)	Trunk volume	Batteries
1	Jan 2015	May 2017	1,730 mm (68 in)	690 mm (27 in)	1,215 mm (47.8 in)	1,230 mm (48 in)	112 / 94 kg (247 / 207 lb)	24.5 L (0.87 ft^{3})	2
2	May 2017	current	1,880 mm (74 in)	670 mm (26 in)	1,090 mm (43 in)	1,306 mm (51.4 in)	122 / 104 kg (269 / 229 lb)	25 L (0.88 ft^{3})	2
3	May 2019	Mar 2022	1,845 mm (72.6 in)	665 mm (26.2 in)	1,095 mm (43.1 in)	1,298 mm (51.1 in)	114 / 96 kg (251 / 212 lb)	26.5 L (0.94 ft^{3})	2
Viva	Sep 2019	Jun 2025	1,680 mm (66 in)	630 mm (25 in)	1,050 mm (41 in)	1,164 mm (45.8 in)	80 / 71 kg (176 / 157 lb)	21.6 L (0.76 ft^{3})	1
Viva Mix	Feb 2021	current	1,770 mm (70 in)	725 mm (28.5 in)	1,093 mm (43.0 in)	1,235 mm (48.6 in)	112 / 94 kg (247 / 207 lb)	23.9 L (0.84 ft^{3})	2
CrossOver	Oct 2023	current	1,949 mm (76.7 in)	673 mm (26.5 in)	1,132 mm (44.6 in)	1,374 mm (54.1 in)	126 / 108 kg (278 / 238 lb)	18 L (0.64 ft^{3})	2
Pulse	Jan 2024	current	1,855 mm (73.0 in)	796 mm (31.3 in)	1,240 mm (49 in)	1,332 mm (52.4 in)	135 / 115 kg (298 / 254 lb)	21 L (0.74 ft^{3}) + 2×2.5 L (0.088 ft^{3})	2
JEGO	Apr 2024	Dec 2024	1,827 mm (71.9 in)	685 mm (27.0 in)	1,230 mm (48 in)	1,340 mm (53 in)	97 / 77 kg (214 / 170 lb)	22.3 L (0.79 ft^{3})	1 or 2

==== 1 Series ====
As initially described in early 2015, the 1 Series traction motor has a maximum power and torque output of 6.4 kW (8.6 hp) at 3250 RPM and 25 N⋅m (18 lbf⋅ft) between 0 and 2250 RPM, respectively. Nominal dimensions are 1,730 mm (68 in) long, 690 mm (27 in) wide, and 1,215 mm (47.8 in) high, riding on a wheelbase of 1,230 mm (48 in). The seat height is fixed at 745 mm (29.3 in) and the scooter weighs 94 kg (207 lb) without batteries and 112 kg (247 lb) with two traction batteries. There is lockable storage of up to 24.5 L (0.87 ft^{3}) under the seat, alongside the battery slots. While the original 1 Series was available in black or white with silver frame / trim, the 1 Plus added more color options with a darker gray frame color.

The S1 variant is equipped with an uprated motor which boosts output to 7.2 kW (9.7 hp) at 5000 RPM and 27 N⋅m (20 lbf⋅ft) between 0 and 2250 RPM, otherwise sharing the same nominal dimensions and weight. This improves the 0–50 km/h (0–31 mph) acceleration time from 4.2 sec to 3.7 sec. The front brake of the S1 is slightly larger than other 1 Series scooters.

The rear wheel is driven through a planetary reduction gear and Gates carbon belt.

==== 2 Series ====
Like the preceding 1 Series, the base model of the 2 Series was distinguished from the 2 Plus mainly by the variety of colors available with the latter. 2 Series scooters were longer, wider, and lower than the 1 Series at 1,880 mm × 670 mm × 1,090 mm (74 in × 26 in × 43 in) for the length, width, and height, respectively; the wheelbase was extended to 1,306 mm (51.4 in) and seat height increased to 770 mm (30 in). Nominal weight was also increased to 122 and 104 kg (269 and 229 lb) with and without the two traction batteries, respectively. Underseat storage was increased to 25 L (0.88 ft^{3}).

The 2 and 2 Plus were equipped with a motor with similar outputs as the 1 Series, with a maximum power of 6.4 kW (8.6 hp) at 3000 RPM and maximum torque of 25 N⋅m (18 lbf⋅ft) between 0 and 2500 RPM.

Gogoro scooter model specifications As of 2025-09-11
Characteristic Series Model		Image	Dates		Performance		Output		Range
Characteristic Series Model		Image	Intro	Disc	Top speed	Acceleration 0–50 km/h (31 mph)	Power	Torque	Range
1 Series	Lite		Oct 2015	May 2017	95 km/h (59 mph)	4.0 sec.	6.4 kW (8.6 hp) @ 4500 RPM	27 N⋅m (20 lbf⋅ft) @ 0–2250 RPM	>100 km (62 mi) at 40 km/h (25 mph)
1 Series	1		Jan 2015	Oct 2023	95 km/h (59 mph)	4.0 sec.	6.4 kW (8.6 hp) @ 4500 RPM	27 N⋅m (20 lbf⋅ft) @ 0–2250 RPM	>100 km (62 mi) at 40 km/h (25 mph)
1 Series	1 Plus		Jun 2015	Oct 2023	95 km/h (59 mph)	4.0 sec.	6.4 kW (8.6 hp) @ 4500 RPM	27 N⋅m (20 lbf⋅ft) @ 0–2250 RPM	>100 km (62 mi) at 40 km/h (25 mph)
1 Series	1 GT		Oct 2020	Oct 2023	95 km/h (59 mph)	3.7 sec.	7.2 kW (9.7 hp) @ 5000 RPM	27 N⋅m (20 lbf⋅ft) @ 0–2250 RPM	>100 km (62 mi) at 40 km/h (25 mph)
1 Series	S1		Oct 2016	Nov 2023	95 km/h (59 mph)	3.7 sec.	7.2 kW (9.7 hp) @ 5000 RPM	27 N⋅m (20 lbf⋅ft) @ 0–2250 RPM	>100 km (62 mi) at 40 km/h (25 mph)
2 Series	2		May 2017	May 2019	90 km/h (56 mph)	4.3 sec.	6.4 kW (8.6 hp) @ 3000 RPM	25 N⋅m (18 lbf⋅ft) @ 0–2250 RPM	>110 km (68 mi) at 40 km/h (25 mph)
2 Series	2 Plus		May 2017	Apr 2021	90 km/h (56 mph)	4.3 sec.	6.4 kW (8.6 hp) @ 3000 RPM	25 N⋅m (18 lbf⋅ft) @ 0–2250 RPM	>110 km (68 mi) at 40 km/h (25 mph)
2 Series	2 Deluxe		Jan 31, 2018	Jun 2019	90 km/h (56 mph)	4.3 sec.	6.4 kW (8.6 hp) @ 3000 RPM	25 N⋅m (18 lbf⋅ft) @ 0–2250 RPM	>110 km (68 mi) at 40 km/h (25 mph)
2 Series	2 Delight		May 29, 2018	May 2022	88 km/h (55 mph)	4.3 sec.	6.4 kW (8.6 hp) @ 3000 RPM	25 N⋅m (18 lbf⋅ft) @ 0–2250 RPM	>110 km (68 mi) at 40 km/h (25 mph)
2 Series	2 Rumbler		May 29, 2018	Sep 2020	86 km/h (53 mph)	4.6 sec.	6.4 kW (8.6 hp) @ 3000 RPM	25 N⋅m (18 lbf⋅ft) @ 0–2250 RPM	>96 km (60 mi) at 40 km/h (25 mph)
2 Series	2 GT		Oct 14, 2020	Mar 2021	90 km/h (56 mph)	TBA	7.0 kW (9.4 hp) @ 3000 RPM	26.6 N⋅m (19.6 lbf⋅ft) @ 0–2500 RPM	170 km (110 mi) at 30 km/h (19 mph)
2 Series	2 Premium		Apr 27, 2021	Jan 2023	90 km/h (56 mph)	TBA	7.0 kW (9.4 hp) @ 3000 RPM	26.6 N⋅m (19.6 lbf⋅ft) @ 0–2500 RPM	170 km (110 mi) at 30 km/h (19 mph)
2 Series	Premium		Feb 16, 2023	current	90 km/h (56 mph)	TBA	7.0 kW (9.4 hp) @ 3000 RPM	26.6 N⋅m (19.6 lbf⋅ft) @ 0–2500 RPM	170 km (110 mi) at 30 km/h (19 mph)
2 Series	S2		May 29, 2018	Mar 2022	92 km/h (57 mph)	3.9 sec.	7.6 kW (10.2 hp) @ 3000 RPM	26 N⋅m (19 lbf⋅ft) @ 0–2250 RPM	>110 km (68 mi) at 40 km/h (25 mph)
2 Series	S2 Café Racer		Nov 6, 2018	Mar 2022	92 km/h (57 mph)	3.9 sec.	7.6 kW (10.2 hp) @ 3000 RPM	26 N⋅m (19 lbf⋅ft) @ 0–2250 RPM	>110 km (68 mi) at 40 km/h (25 mph)
2 Series	S2 Adventure		Nov 6, 2018	Mar 2022	92 km/h (57 mph)	3.9 sec.	7.6 kW (10.2 hp) @ 3000 RPM	26 N⋅m (19 lbf⋅ft) @ 0–2250 RPM	>110 km (68 mi) at 40 km/h (25 mph)
2 Series	SuperSport		Mar 16, 2022	current	96 km/h (60 mph)	TBA	7.6 kW (10.2 hp) @ 3000 RPM	28 N⋅m (21 lbf⋅ft) @ 0–2500 RPM	170 km (110 mi) at 30 km/h (19 mph)
3 Series	3		May 8, 2019	Mar 2022	82 km/h (51 mph)	4.9 sec.	6.0 kW (8.0 hp) @ 3000 RPM	22 N⋅m (16 lbf⋅ft) @ 0–2500 RPM	>110 km (68 mi) at 40 km/h (25 mph)
3 Series	3 Plus		May 8, 2019	Mar 2022	86 km/h (53 mph)	4.7 sec.	6.2 kW (8.3 hp) @ 3000 RPM	23 N⋅m (17 lbf⋅ft) @ 0–2500 RPM	>110 km (68 mi) at 40 km/h (25 mph)
3 Series	3 GT		Oct 14, 2020	Mar 2021	90 km/h (56 mph)	TBA	7.0 kW (9.4 hp) @ 3000 RPM	26.6 N⋅m (19.6 lbf⋅ft) @ 0–2500 RPM	170 km (110 mi) at 30 km/h (19 mph)
3 Series	3 Premium		Apr 27, 2021	Mar 2022	90 km/h (56 mph)	TBA	7.0 kW (9.4 hp) @ 3000 RPM	26.6 N⋅m (19.6 lbf⋅ft) @ 0–2500 RPM	170 km (110 mi) at 30 km/h (19 mph)
3 Series	S3		Jun 23, 2020	Mar 2022	90 km/h (56 mph)	3.7 sec.	7.6 kW (10.2 hp) @ 3000 RPM	26 N⋅m (19 lbf⋅ft) @ 0–2500 RPM	>110 km (68 mi) at 40 km/h (25 mph)
3 Series	VIVA XL		Jul 14, 2021	current	90 km/h (56 mph)	TBA	6.4 kW (8.6 hp) @ 3000 RPM	24 N⋅m (18 lbf⋅ft) @ 0–2500 RPM	170 km (110 mi) at 30 km/h (19 mph)
VIVA	VIVA		Sep 26, 2019	Jun 2025	63 km/h (39 mph)	TBA	3.0 kW (4.0 hp) @ 500 RPM	115 N⋅m (85 lbf⋅ft) @ 200 RPM (wheel)	85 km (53 mi) at 30 km/h (19 mph)
VIVA	JEGO		Apr 2024	Dec 2024	68 km/h (42 mph)	TBA	2.5 kW (3.4 hp) @ 700 RPM	100 N⋅m (74 lbf⋅ft) @ 0–100 RPM (wheel)	162 km (101 mi) at 30 km/h (19 mph) (dual battery model)
VIVA	EZZY		Jun 17, 2025	current	68 km/h (42 mph)	TBA	2.5 kW (3.4 hp) @ 700 RPM	100 N⋅m (74 lbf⋅ft) @ 0–100 RPM (wheel)	162 km (101 mi) at 30 km/h (19 mph) (dual battery model)
VIVA	EZZY 500		Sep 11, 2025	current	82 km/h (51 mph)	TBA	5.5 kW (7.4 hp) @ 800 RPM	133 N⋅m (98 lbf⋅ft) @ 0–300 RPM	150 km (93 mi) at 30 km/h (19 mph)
VIVA Mix	VIVA Mix		Feb 23, 2021	current	90 km/h (56 mph)	TBA	6.0 kW (8.0 hp) @ 3000 RPM	21 N⋅m (15 lbf⋅ft) @ 0–2500 RPM	150 km (93 mi) at 30 km/h (19 mph)
VIVA Mix	VIVA Mix Superfast		Aug 17, 2021	Sep 2023	92 km/h (57 mph)	TBA	7.2 kW (9.7 hp) @ 3000 RPM	24.4 N⋅m (18.0 lbf⋅ft) @ 0–2500 RPM	150 km (93 mi) at 30 km/h (19 mph)
VIVA Mix	VIVA Mix Superfast ECS		Sep 20, 2022	Sep 2023	92 km/h (57 mph)	TBA	7.2 kW (9.7 hp) @ 3000 RPM	24.4 N⋅m (18.0 lbf⋅ft) @ 0–2500 RPM	150 km (93 mi) at 30 km/h (19 mph)
VIVA Mix	Delight		Jul 14, 2022	current	90 km/h (56 mph)	TBA	7.0 kW (9.4 hp) @ 3000 RPM	26.6 N⋅m (19.6 lbf⋅ft) @ 0–2500 RPM	150 km (93 mi) at 30 km/h (19 mph)
CrossOver	CrossOver		Oct 24, 2023	current	90 km/h (56 mph)	TBA	7.0 kW (9.4 hp) @ 3000 RPM	26.6 N⋅m (19.6 lbf⋅ft) @ 0–2500 RPM	150 km (93 mi) at 30 km/h (19 mph)
CrossOver	CrossOver S		Oct 24, 2023	Jun 2025	96 km/h (60 mph)	TBA	7.6 kW (10.2 hp) @ 3000 RPM	28 N⋅m (21 lbf⋅ft) @ 0–2500 RPM	150 km (93 mi) at 30 km/h (19 mph)
Pulse	Pulse		Jan 30, 2024	current	105 km/h (65 mph)	3.05 sec.	9.0 kW (12.1 hp) @ 4000 RPM	42 N⋅m (31 lbf⋅ft) @ 0–1750 RPM	130 km (81 mi) at 30 km/h (19 mph)

=== Traction battery and charging ===
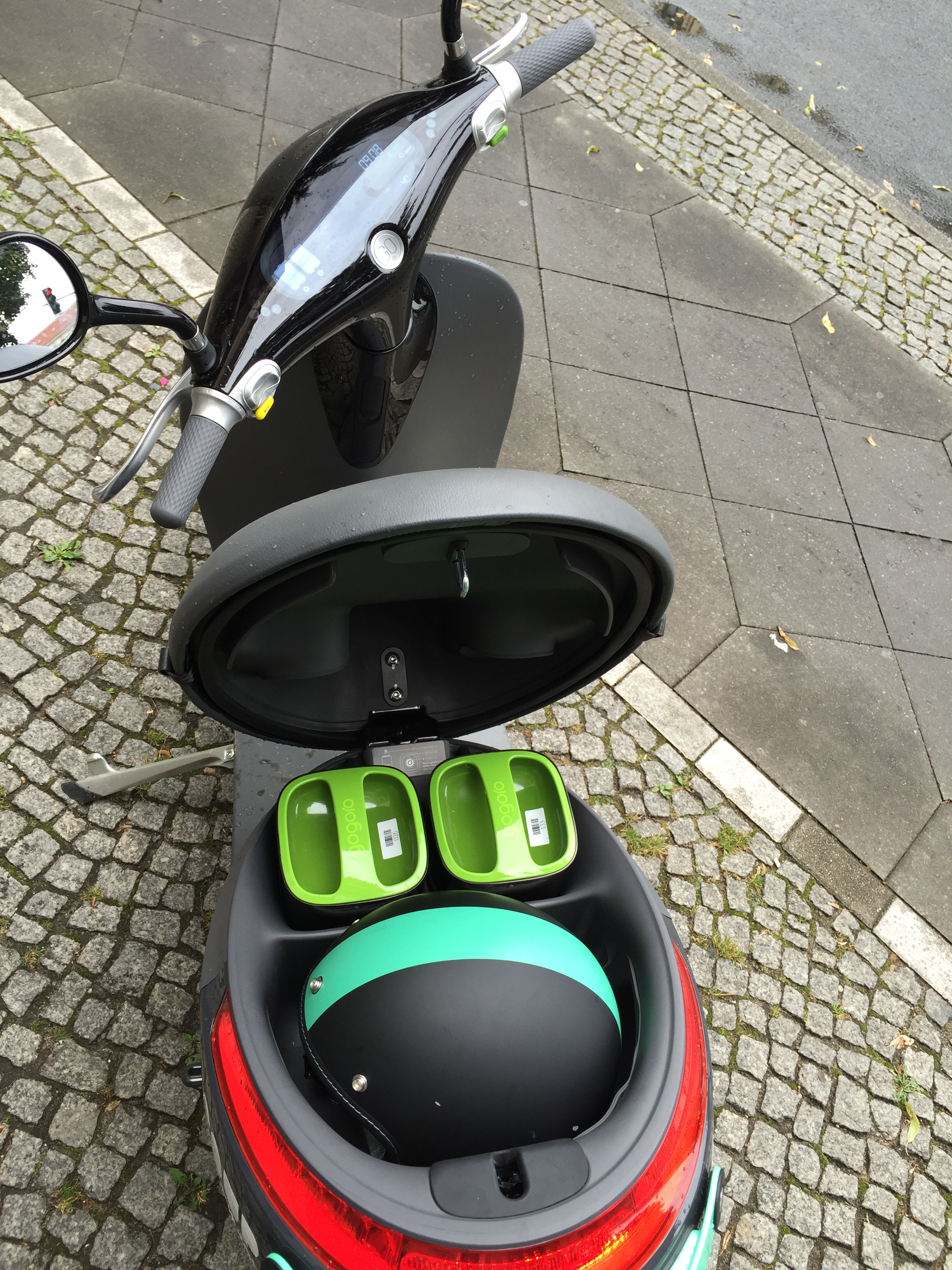
Gogoro 1 Series with seat open, showing traction batteries

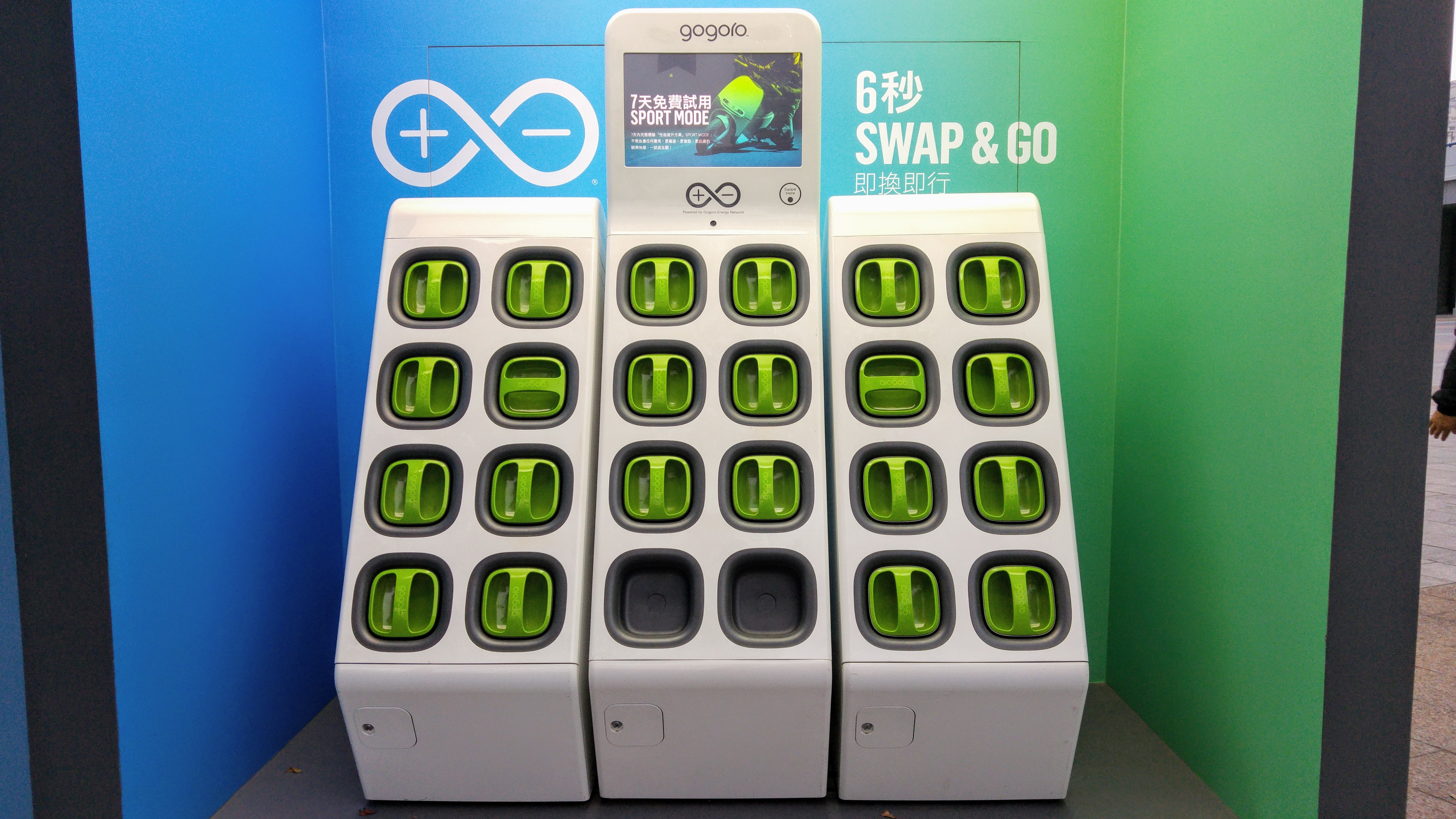
GoStation 1.0 (6×4 battery matrix with two open slots)

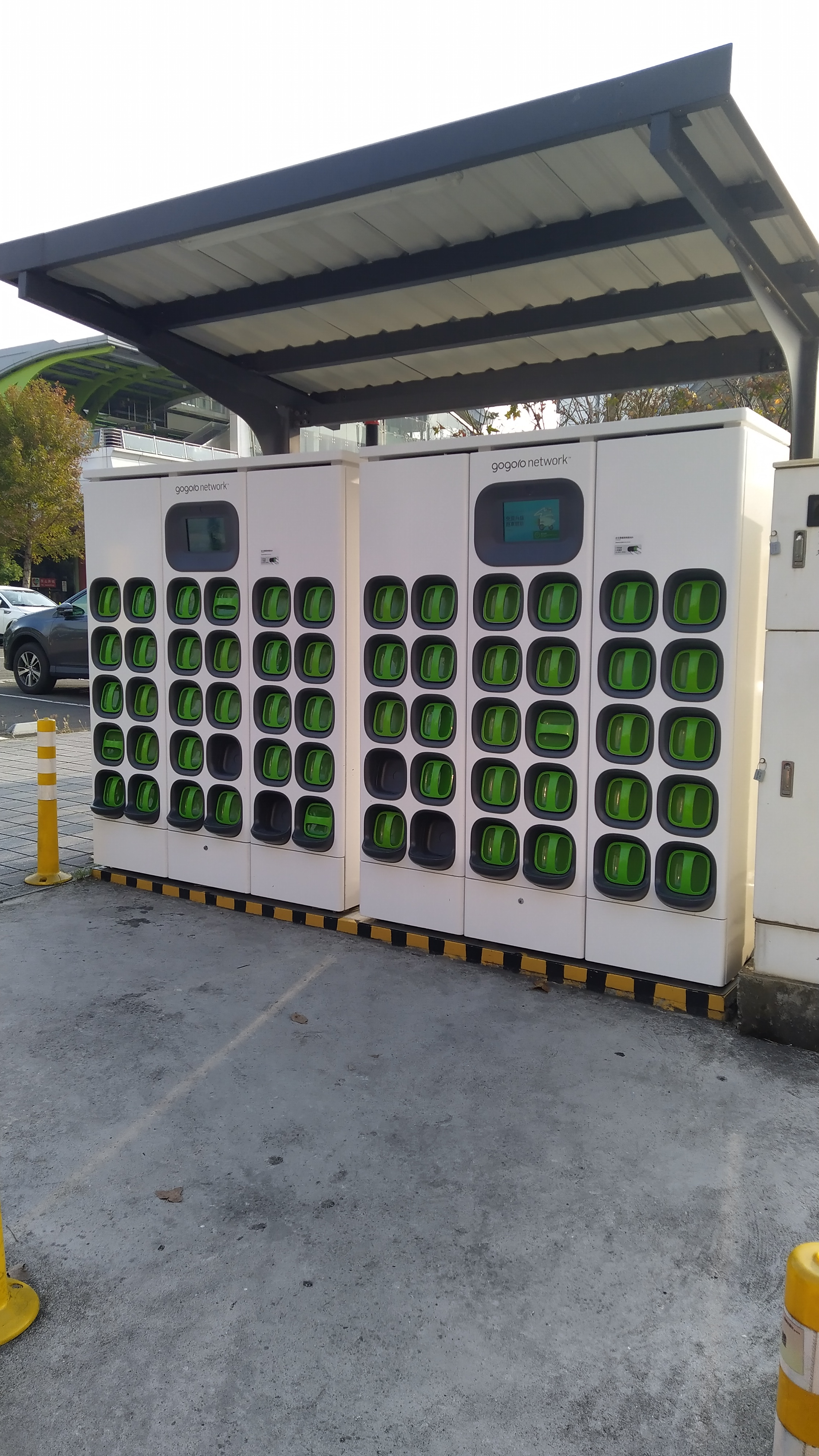
Dual GoStation 3.0 (6×5 battery matrices)

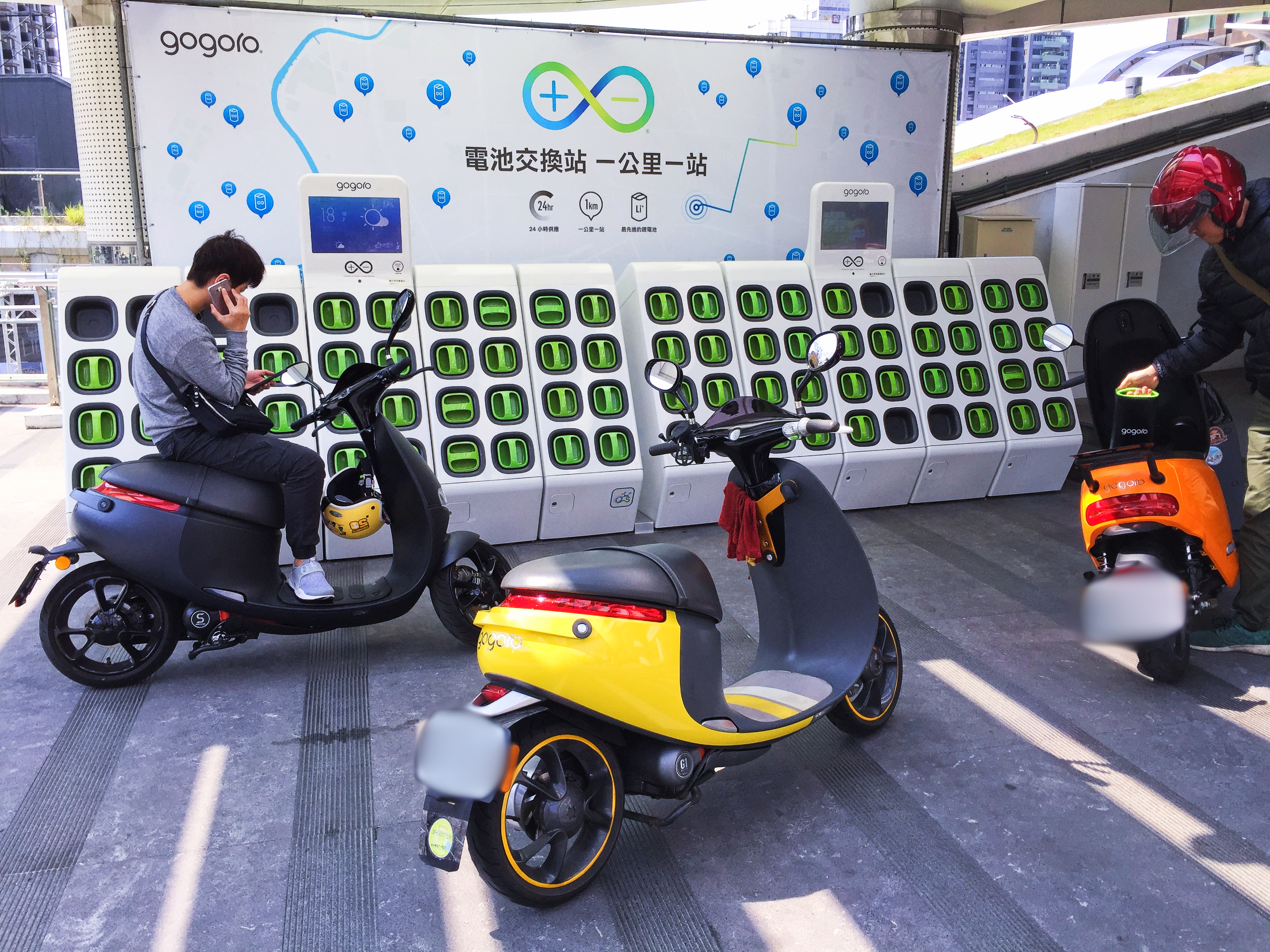
Gogoro scooters at a Super GoStation

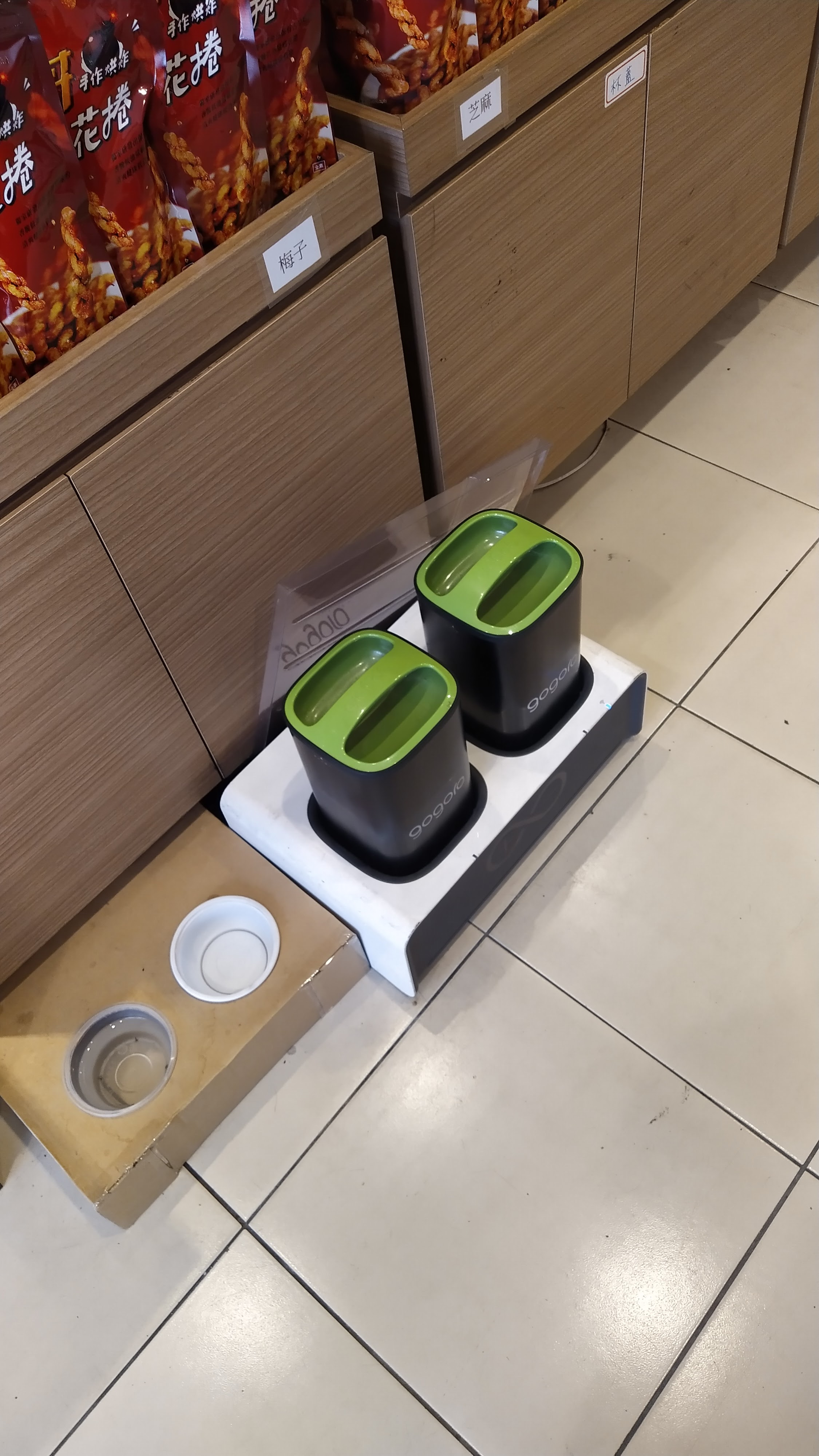
GoCharger with battery packs

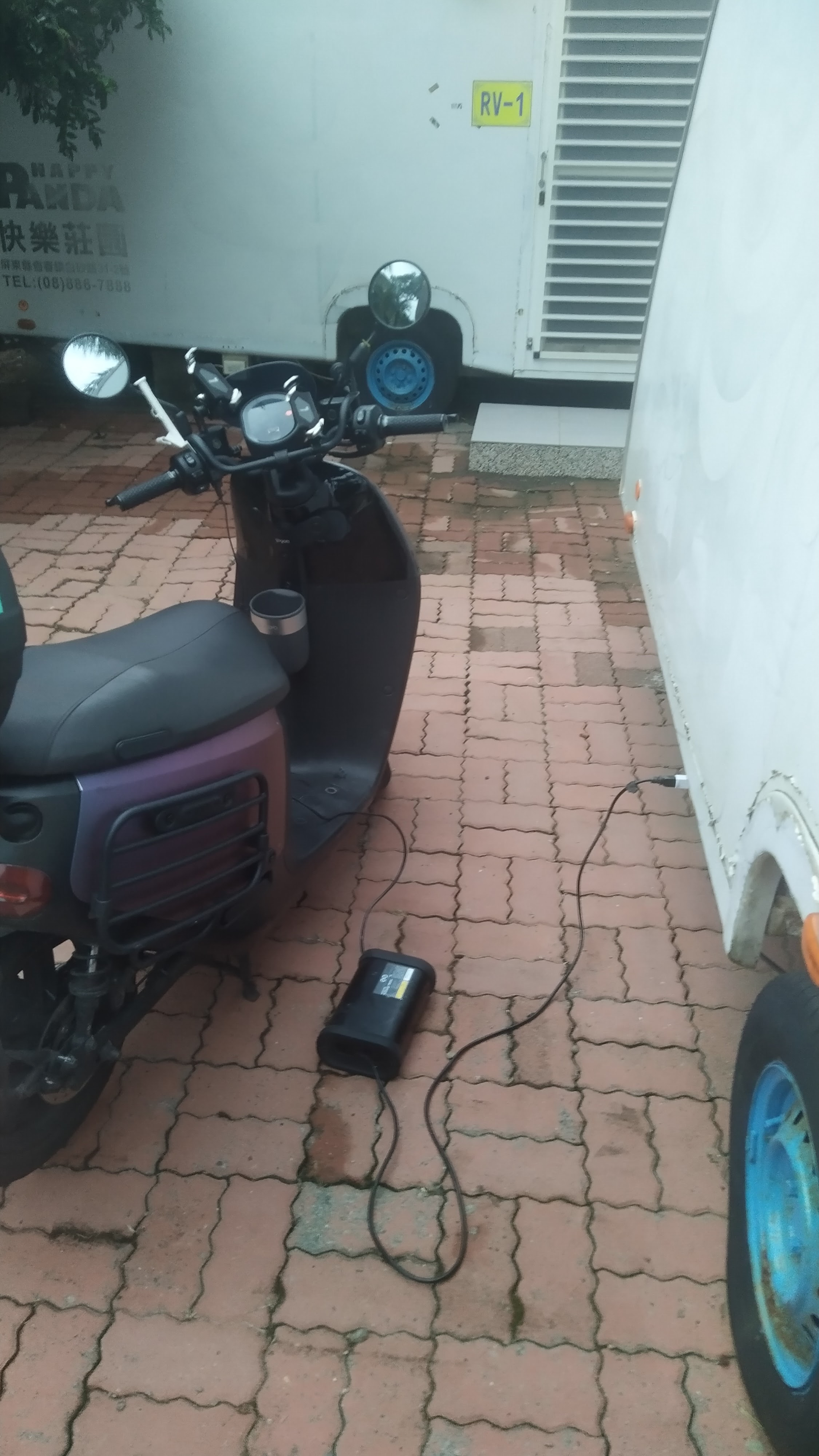
GoCharger Mobile

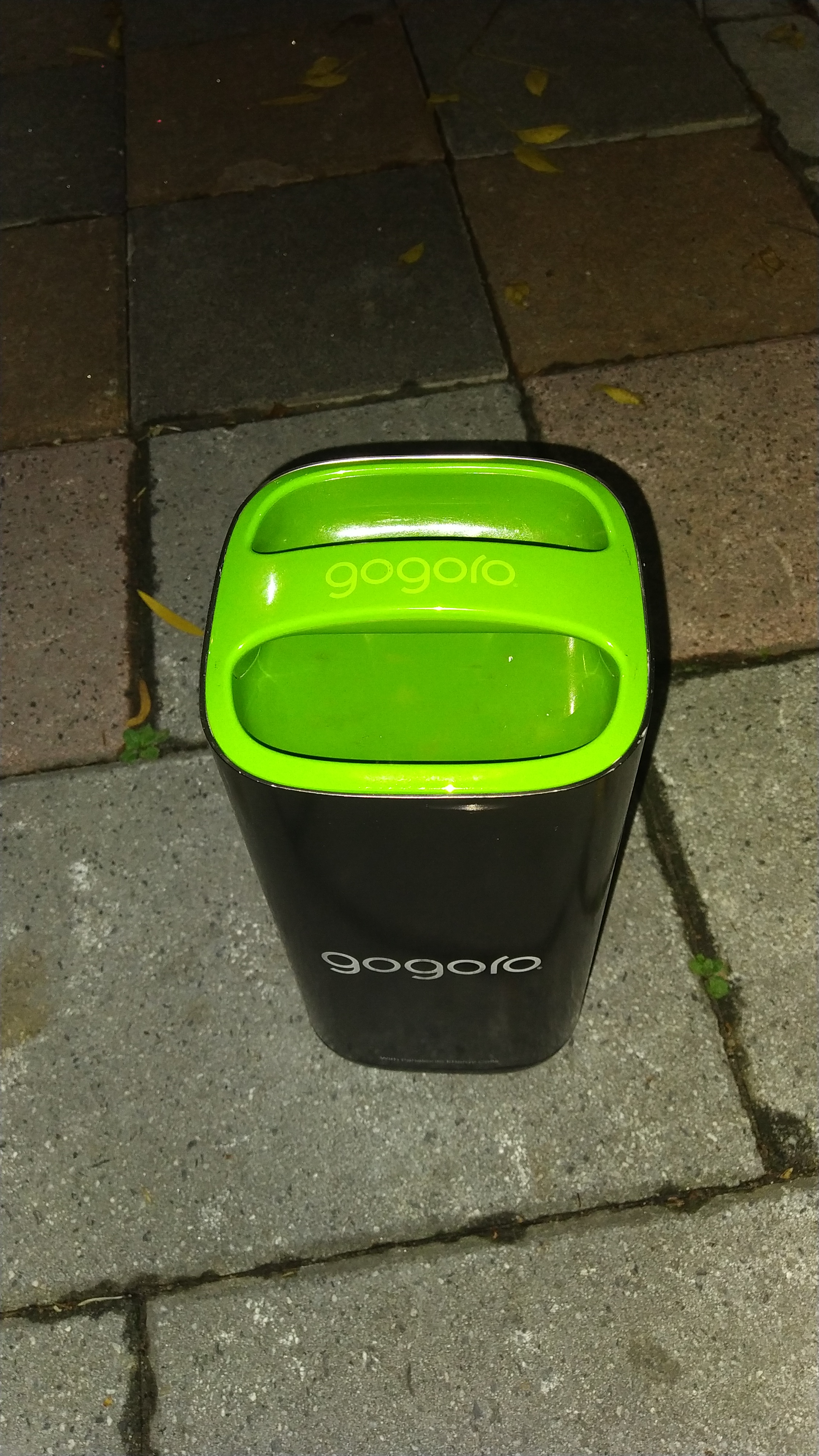
Smart Battery (V1)

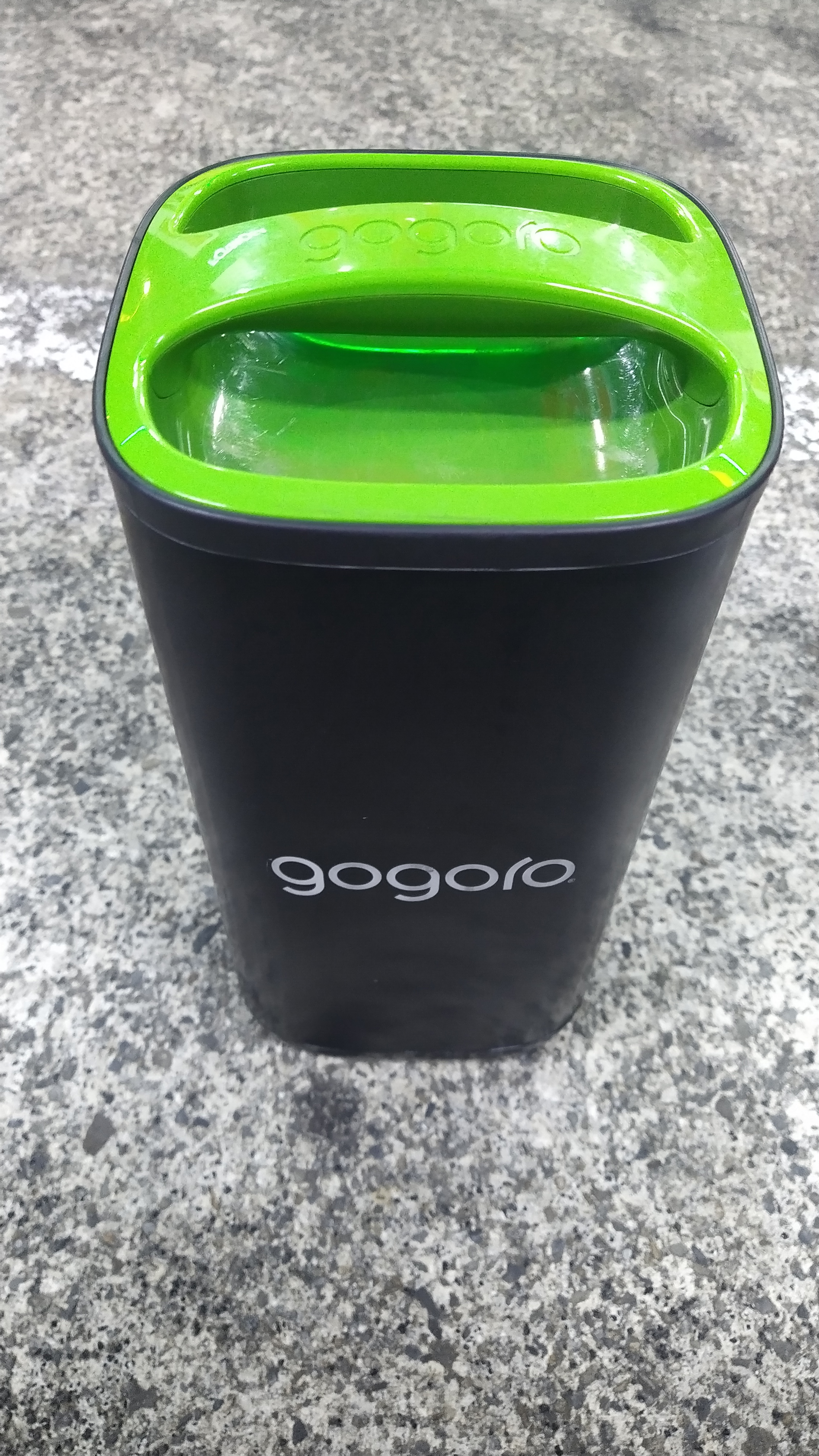
Smart Battery (V2)

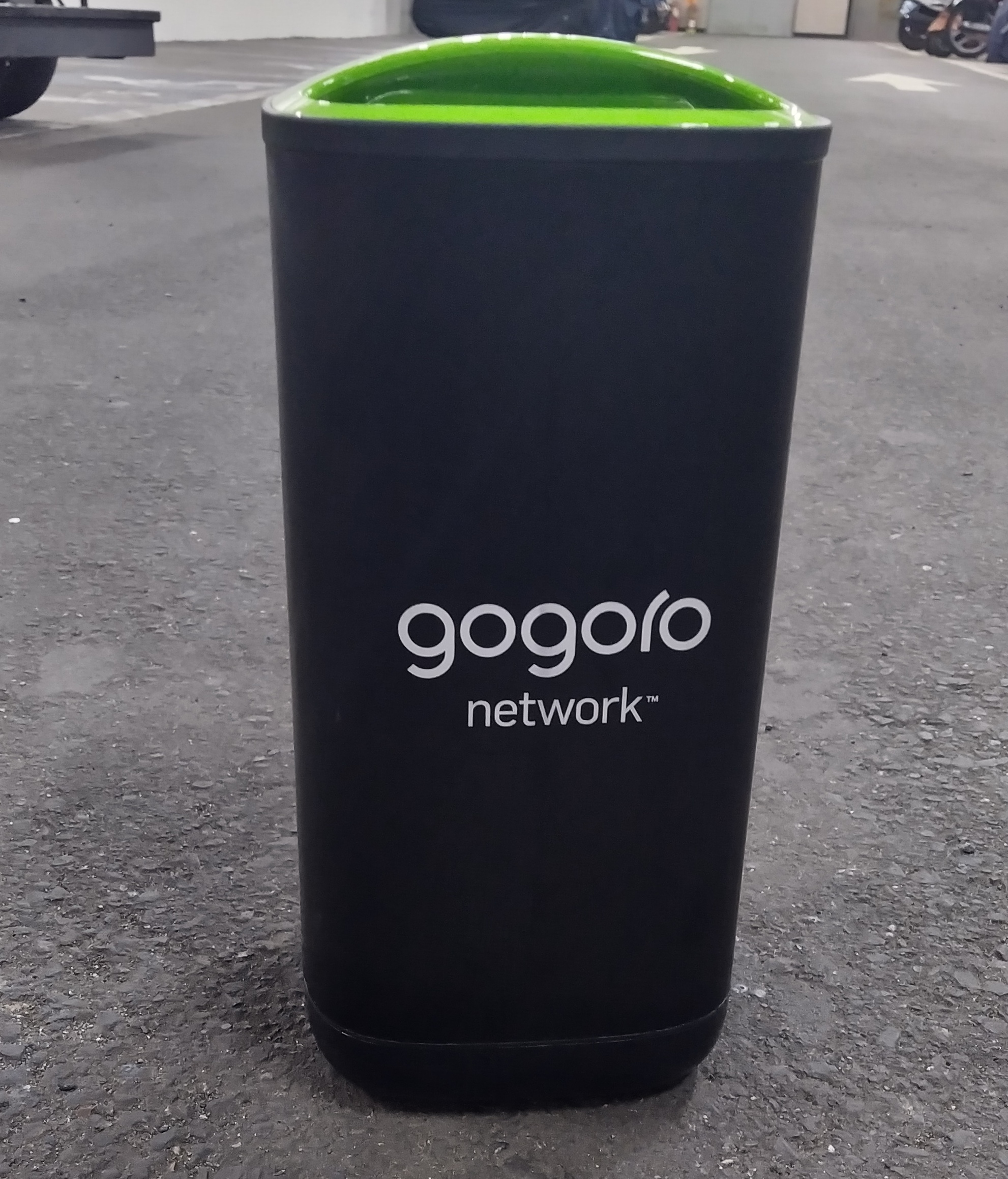
Smart Battery (V3)

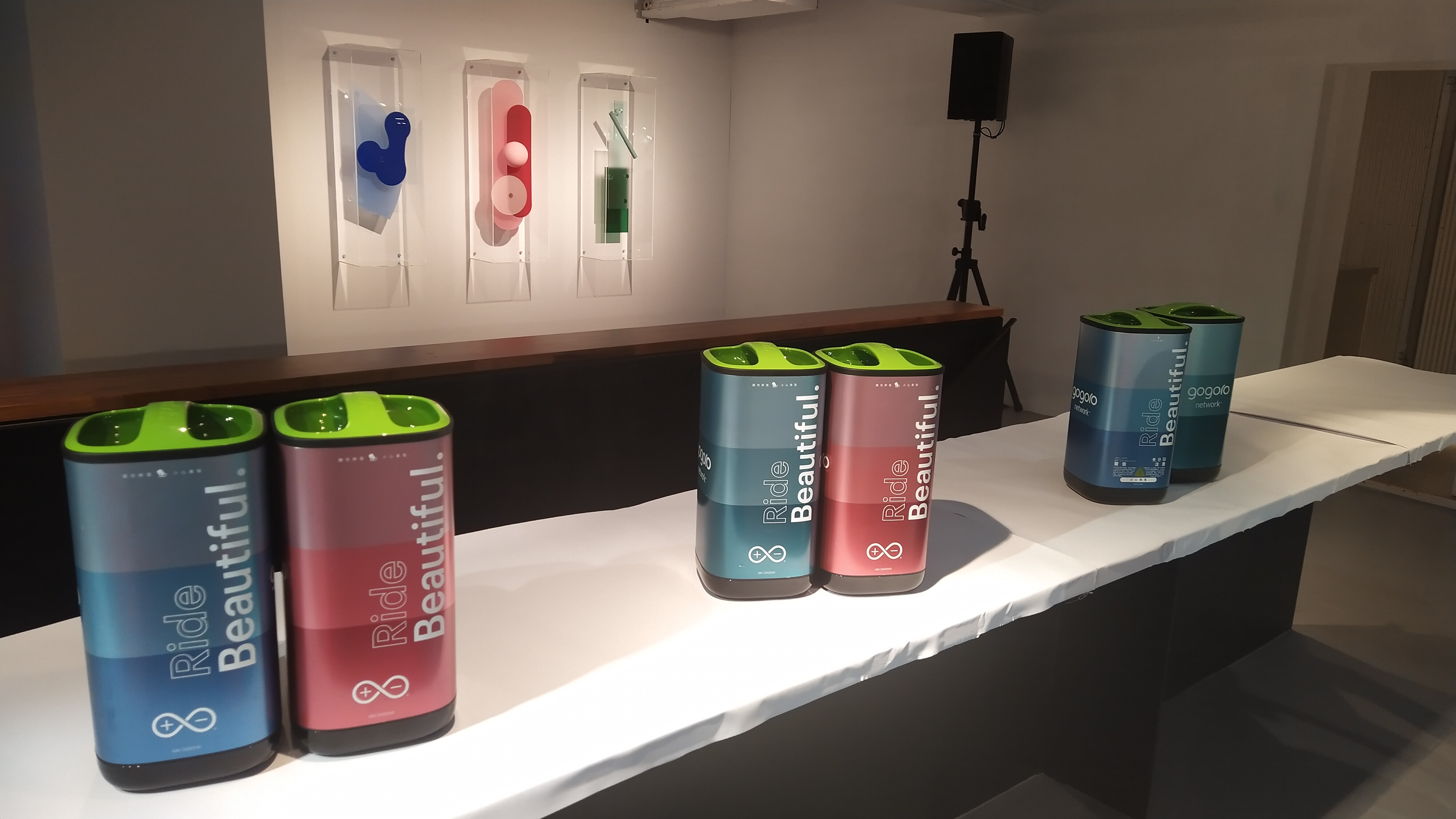
Smart Batteries (V4) in special colors

A Gogoro Smartscooter uses one or two removable battery packs (branded Smart Battery) to power its traction motor; the batteries may be removed and charged indoors (using the GoCharger), by plugging the scooter into an outlet (for 2 Series or newer, using the GoCharger Mobile), or depleted batteries may be exchanged for charged ones at battery swapping stations (branded GoStation) belonging to the Gogoro Network.

==== GoStation ====
The GoStation was an integral part of the Gogoro Smartscooter launch in 2015; to bring vehicle costs in line with gasoline-powered alternatives, the retail price of the Smartscooter did not include the batteries, which were provided under a monthly subscription plan allowing GoStation access. Each GoStation is a large box with a matrix of slots for individual batteries along with a touchscreen to provide information. After the subscriber removes one or two depleted batteries from the scooter and inserts them into empty slot(s) on the GoStation, an equal number of batteries with an equal or higher charge state will pop out from the GoStation after a few seconds; if the battery that was inserted has a higher charge than all the other batteries in the GoStation, it will be returned.

GoStation 2.0 was introduced in 2018 following the blackout of August 15, 2017; although indistinguishable externally from the original (GoStation 1.0), the 2.0 version is fitted with an internal battery which allows it to operate and dispense batteries without being connected to the grid for 48 hours. The third generation GoStation 3.0 was introduced in September 2019, increasing the number of slots in the same footprint; the internal battery is now able to permit battery swapping without grid power for 64 hours.

Gogoro entered a partnership with Enel X in 2022; under the pilot program, additional hardware was attached to ten GoStations in Taiwan, integrating them into Enel X's virtual power plant, which allowed the connected GoStations to reduce, pause, or reverse power draw in response to overall grid demand. The partnership with Enel X had expanded to cover 1,300 GoStations by April 2023, with plans to connect 2,500 GoStations in total by that June, collectively holding 150 MW-hr.

By October 2023, Gogoro had installed nearly 13,000 GoStations in nine countries; in Taiwan, the collective GoStation storage capacity was approximately 2,000 MW-hr.

==== GoCharger ====
The GoCharger is a dual-slot indoor charger which was introduced in January 2016 at CES as part of Gogoro's Owner Proposed Energy Network (OPEN) Initiative. These were offered to businesses without cost if those businesses would allow public access. There are two versions, an overnight charger and a "quick" charger, branded GoCharger or GoCharger Plus, with outputs of 226.35 or 452.7 W per battery, respectively.

GoCharger Mobile, introduced in 2018, allows in-scooter charging using a standard power outlet. A six-hour charge will take an empty battery to 82%. Because the purchase price of the scooter does not include the traction battery, GoCharger Mobile owners still need to subscribe to a battery plan. The GoCharger Mobile connects to a small port under the seat, first fitted to the 2 Series.

==== History ====
Design of the battery pack started in 2011; Horace Luke said "Rather than a bigger battery or a cheaper battery, we built a smarter, safer and more powerful battery to meet the energy demands of cities today and the smart cities of tomorrow." Each battery is connected wirelessly to the Gogoro Network. Each swappable traction battery pack weighs 9 kg (20 lb) and uses lithium ion chemistry. Nominal voltage is 48 V. Gogoro holds patents on the battery design, coaxial connector, and vehicle configuration.

The first generation battery pack, released in 2015 alongside the 1 Series, used 18650 cells supplied by Panasonic with a total storage capacity of 1374 W-hr. The third generation battery, announced in April 2019, uses 21700 cells and the capacity has increased by 27% to 1742 W-hr. In 2022, a prototype lithium ceramic solid-state battery pack was shown, developed in partnership with ProLogium. The estimated capacity of the solid state battery pack is 2500 W-hr.

The Industrial Development Bureau, a division of the Taiwan Ministry of Economic Affairs, proposed making the Gogoro battery specification into a nationwide standard in 2018 after Luke announced Gogoro would sell GoStations to other scooter manufacturers and waive licensing fees; however, Kymco flatly stated they refused to use the Gogoro system.
