= Tesla battery station =

Electric vehicle battery swapping station

Coordinates: 36.2530°N 120.2395°W

The Tesla battery station was a demonstration site at Harris Ranch where Tesla performed traction motor battery swapping as an alternative to recharging its vehicles. The site opened in March 2015 and operated by appointment only but showed little demand by June 2015; it was closed permanently before November 2016.

== History ==
Tesla announced the Tesla station during a June 2013 demonstration event, which showed extremely fast recharging was possible through a 90-second battery swapping process as an alternative to regular Supercharger fast chargers for Tesla Model S vehicles. It was expected that a small fee would be assessed for the battery-swap process. By December 2014, 18 months after the initial announcement, no Tesla battery swapping stations were opened to the public. That month, Tesla announced a pilot battery-swap program would be implemented at a single California site to gauge demand. The pilot battery-swap site at Harris Ranch opened in March 2015, but with little demonstrated use by June, Tesla shut down the pilot battery swapping station.

=== Early plans and projections ===
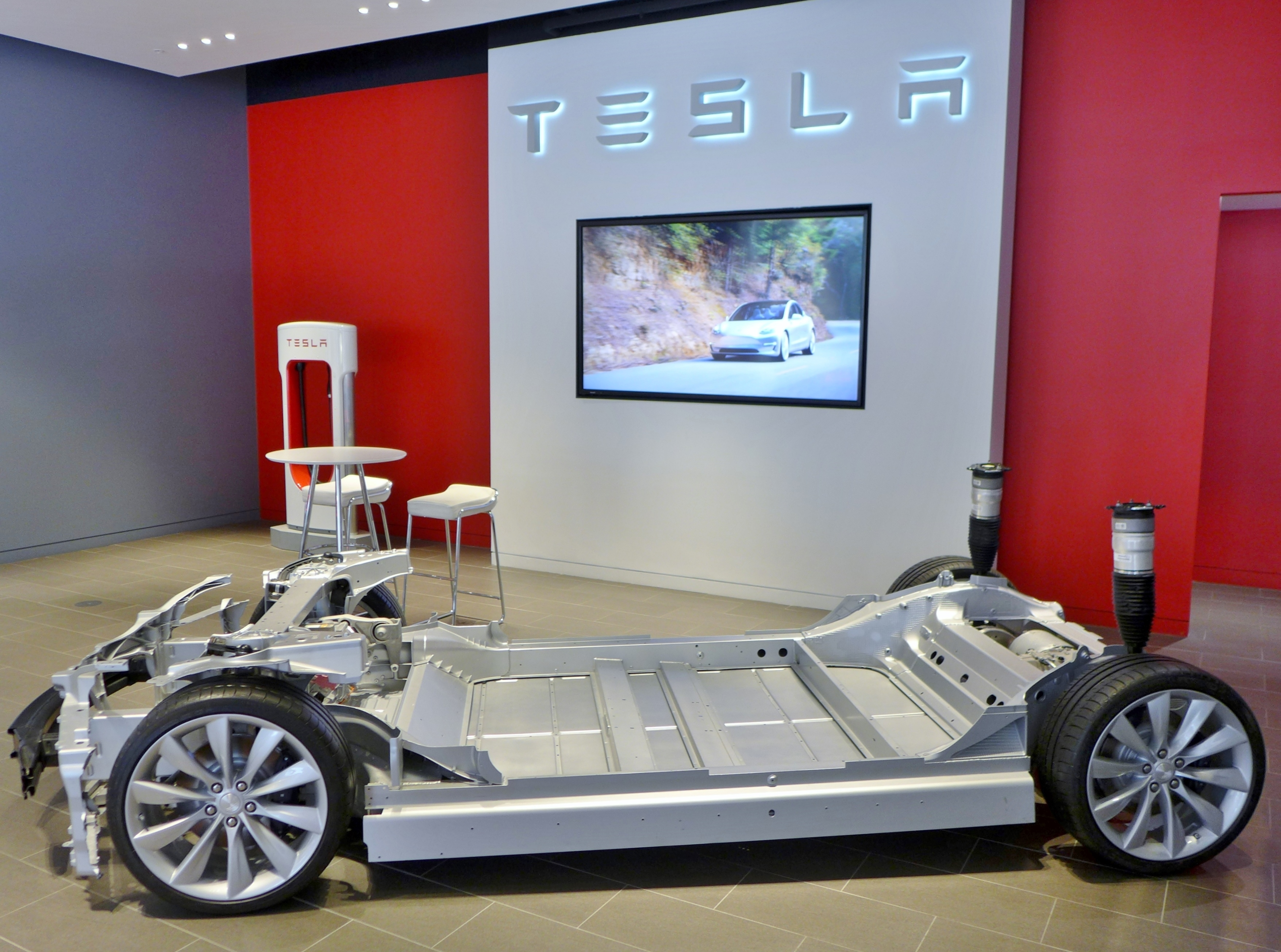
Tesla uses a "skateboard chassis", in which the battery is carried under the floor, allowing it to be dropped out and swapped

In an interview published in 2009, Tesla CEO Elon Musk claimed that automated battery swapping would be the standard method of recharging its vehicles. The Tesla Model S was designed from the outset to support fast charging through battery swapping, with Tesla publicly discussing the capability as early as March 2009. Tesla filed a Form 10-Q with the Securities and Exchange Commission in May 2013, which included several factors that influenced the adoption of its vehicles stating "our capability to rapidly swap out the Model S battery pack and the development of specialized public facilities to perform such swapping, which do not currently exist but which we plan to introduce in the near future".

=== Demonstration ===
"The only decision you need to make when you come to one of our Tesla stations is, do you prefer faster or free. Our goal here was to eliminate the objections that people have. We want to show that [Tesla] can actually be more convenient than a gasoline car. Hopefully this is what convinces people that electric cars are the future."

— Elon Musk, quoted in 2013 CNN Money article

At an event in June 2013 at Tesla's design studio in Los Angeles, CEO Elon Musk demonstrated a battery swap operation with the Tesla Model S, which took slightly longer than 90 seconds each for the two cars participating in the demo. The swapping operation took less than half the time needed to refill a gasoline-powered car used for comparison purposes during the event. A patent was filed in 2014 and granted in 2019.

=== Pilot implementation ===
Additionally at the June 2013 demonstration, Tesla had planned to deploy a battery swapping station at each of its existing Supercharger stations, which would be renamed Tesla stations. Each swapping station was projected to cost US$500,000 and have approximately 50 batteries available without requiring reservations.

While Supercharger use was free, the battery swap was expected to carry approximately the same cost as a full tank (approximately 15 US gallons (57 L; 12 imp gal)) of premium gasoline, approximately US$60 to US$80 at June 2013 prices. Owners also would have the option to swap back to their own battery pack, fully charged, on the return trip for no extra payment. Tesla also planned to offer an option to keep the pack received on the swap, paying the price difference if the battery received is newer; or to receive the original pack back from Tesla for a transport fee. The billing would be handled via customer credit card on file with Tesla. When the pilot service launched in 2015, the cost was set to US$80.

The first Tesla Station with battery-swapping capability was scheduled to be built in California late in 2013, but this was subsequently delayed. Elon Musk said at an event in February 2014 that a few battery swap stations would be opened in the next few months along the route between Los Angeles and San Francisco, and that the initial stations would be studied before deciding to build any more.

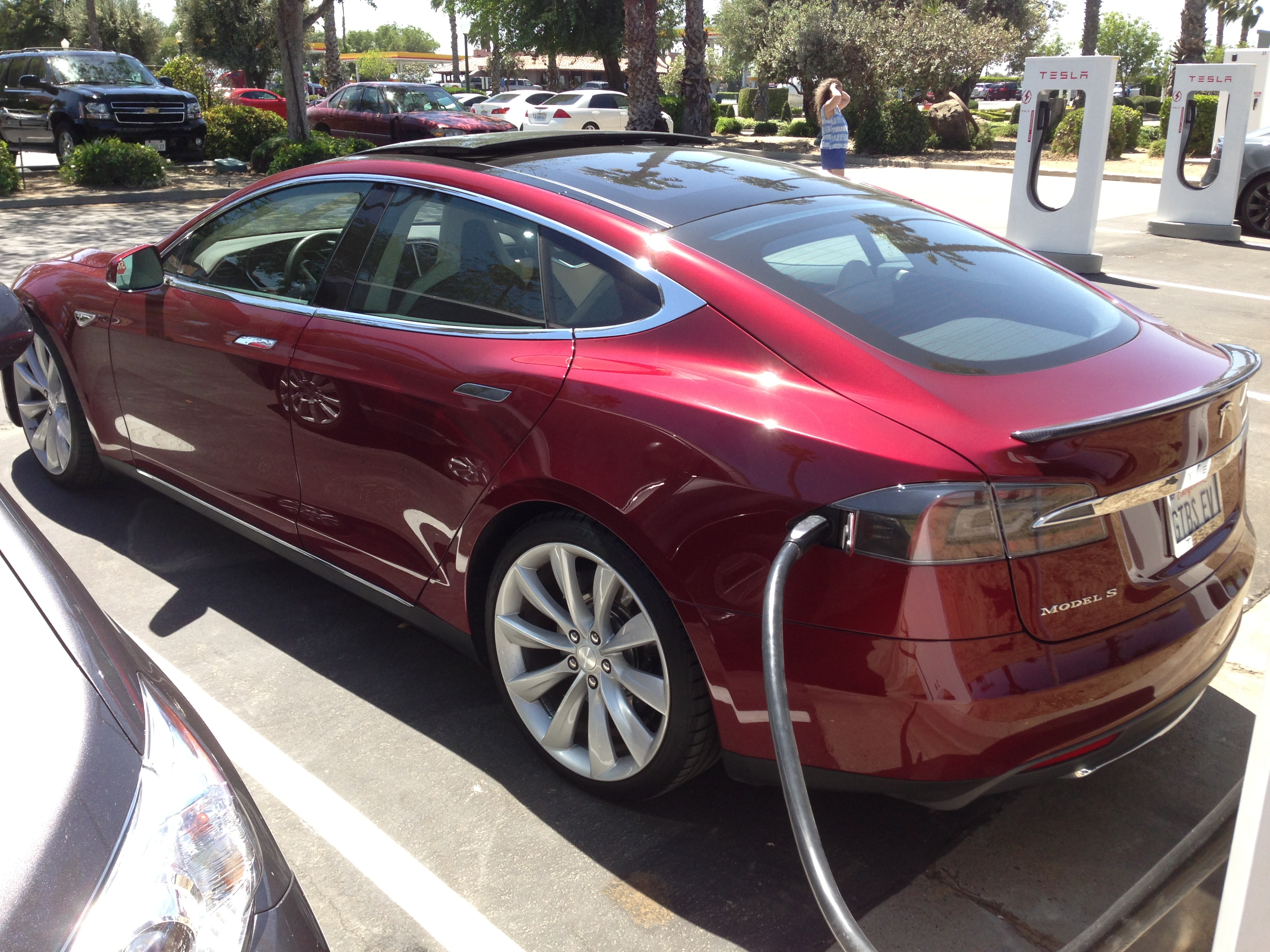
Tesla Model S at the Supercharger station near Harris Ranch (2013)

By December 2014, 18 months after the proof-of-concept demonstration, no battery-swapping stations had been opened to the public; on December 19, Tesla implemented a "Battery Swap Pilot Program" to build a single battery-swapping station near the Supercharger station at Harris Ranch near Coalinga, California. The Harris Ranch swapping station was used to "assess demand" for the paid service, offered only to invited Model S owners by appointment. The company stated they would "evaluate relative demand from customers ... to assess whether it merits the engineering resources and investment necessary" for the upgrade of additional first-generation Supercharger stations. The scheduled duration of the swap had doubled to three minutes. By the time the service launched in 2015, actual swap times varied from five to fifteen minutes.

Work on the battery swapping station, housed in a former car wash building, was underway by late December. The Harris Ranch swapping station was open by March 2015. When journalist Edward Niedermeyer observed the battery swap station over the Memorial Day weekend in May 2015, it was serving as a secondary Supercharger station, powered by diesel generators, rather than swapping batteries. In June 2015, Tesla announced that of 200 invitations sent out to try the pilot pack-swap station, only approximately five tried it. Tesla then invited all California Model S owners to try it out but expected a low usage rate. A survey showed that most users were not interested.

=== Discontinuation ===
"It's just, people don't care about pack swap. The Superchargers are fast enough [...] and [they're] free. So, it's like, why would you do the pack swap? It doesn't make much sense. [...] based on what we're seeing here, it's unlikely to be something that's worth expanding in the future, unless something changes."

— Elon Musk, quoted in 2015 Road & Track article

The company later indicated that battery swapping capabilities was no longer a significant part of Tesla's plans for on-road energy replacement for their vehicles. Musk noted that Supercharger technology had advanced sufficiently and claimed "people don't care about pack swap" at the 2015 annual shareholder meeting. By November 2016, the battery swap station at Harris Ranch was no longer accepting appointments.

In 2021, Tesla China denied that it was planning to begin battery swapping based on a new business registration, and added the concept of battery swapping was "riddled with problems and not suitable for widescale use."

== Regulatory issues ==
The California Air Resources Board (CARB) classifies Zero Emission Vehicles (ZEVs) according to their range and speed of range replenishment through charging or refueling, granting more credits for cars that had a long range and short replenishment times. As initially released in 2012, the Model S with an 85 kW-hr battery was classified as a Tier 3 ZEV, which meant it had a minimum range of at least 200 mi (320 km) on a single charge without considering replenishment speed, earning Tesla four credits per Model S sold. Later that year, CARB reclassified it as a Tier 5 ZEV, which meant the Model S had a minimum range of 300 mi (480 km) and range replenishment of 285 mi (459 km) within 15 minutes, earning seven credits per vehicle. The language of the ZEV regulation allowed CARB to credit a vehicle with fast replenishment capabilities through a technology demonstration, such as the June 2013 event, regardless of whether that capability was in widespread use, which was perceived as a loophole; Niedermeyer said "it's no surprise that Tesla engineered the Model S to be swap-capable" to earn the extra credits.

CARB staff subsequently considered modifying the ZEV regulation to exclude battery swapping as a "fast refueling" technology altogether; this change would deny Tesla some of the ZEV credits that the manufacturer might otherwise receive when the battery-swapping station was placed in service in California. During the public comment phase, Tesla proposed "manufacturers wishing to receive fast refueling designation submit data on an annual basis to ARB staff showing that their fast refueling technology is both available and in use by customers", resulting in a modified proposal. Starting with the 2015 model year, the ZEV regulation was updated so that fast-replenishment capability was based on "actual fast refueling events", rather than merely demonstrating the potential to do so. By April 2014, CARB had clarified its rules meant that manufacturers of vehicles capable of battery swapping were required to provide usage data showing the actual number of swaps and how many miles were covered using battery swapping, in addition to total mileage data. In March 2015, an article was published in the Los Angeles Times questioning whether the Harris Ranch battery swapping station was meant to increase the number of regulatory credits per vehicle.
