= Aeontek =

Company of Taiwan

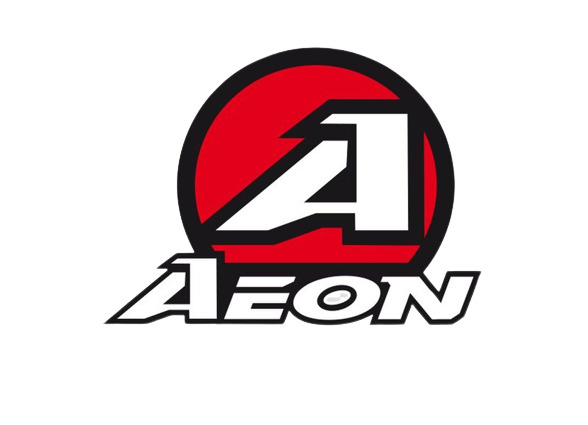
- Native name: 宏佳騰動力科技
- Formerly: Aeon motor
- Industry: Manufacturing
- Founded: 1998
- Headquarters: Shanshang, Tainan, Taiwan
- Website: www.aeonmotor.com.tw

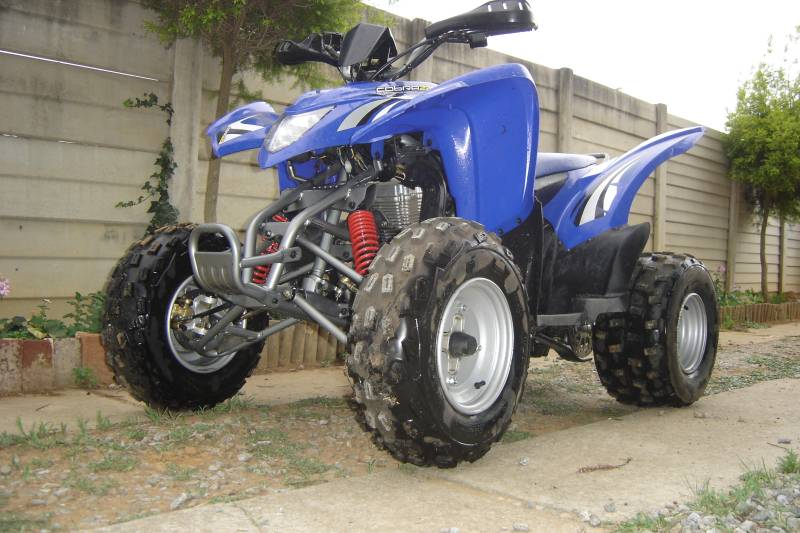
AEON Cobra 220

Aeontek (Chinese: 宏佳騰動力科技) is an exporter and manufacturer of ATVs, scooters and mini-bikes in Taiwan and is based in Tainan City, Taiwan.

== History ==
Aeon Motor Co., Ltd. (commonly known as Aeon) was founded in 1998. It is a Taiwanese manufacturer of scooters, quad bikes, all‑terrain vehicles (ATVs/UTVs), motorcycles, and electric vehicles. Operating under the brand name “Aeon Motor,” the company focuses mainly on producing and selling ATVs and motorcycles, with exports primarily to Europe and the Americas. The company’s origins date back to 1970, when Zhong Jinsheng founded Kuan Mei Plastics Co., Ltd., initially engaged in plastic injection molding. Starting in 1982, production gradually shifted toward plastic components for motorcycles.

In 1998, anticipating growth in the motorcycle industry, the company established Aeon Industry Co., Ltd., dedicated to manufacturing and selling motorcycles, quad bikes, and off‑road vehicles. In December 2003, Aeon Motor Co., Ltd. was established, taking over the production lines and commercial operations of Aeon Industry. Aeon also became an ODM/OEM supplier for Polaris Industries, one of the world’s leading ATV manufacturers, making it one of the few Taiwanese companies active in ATV production.

Its main competitors in Taiwan include Yamaha, SYM, Kymco, Suzuki, and PGO. As electric mobility gained momentum worldwide, Aeon began collaborating with Gogoro Network.

Aeon Motor also have a long-standing partnership with the Swiss company Quadro Vehicles (now known as Qooder), primarily involving manufacturing, engine supply, and shared component technology for their three- and four-wheeled tilting scooters.

On August 28, 2019, it launched its first electric scooter under the “Aeon Smart Electric Vehicles” brand: the Ai‑1 Sport.

Aeon's revenue was NT$2.29 billion (US$70.5 million) in 2024.

Aeon began mass production at a plant in Vietnam in April 2025.

== Product ==
=== Motorcycles ===
- Aeon MY 125/150 (2011-present)

=== Scooters ===
- Aeon STR 250/300 (2022-present)
- Aeon Co-In 125
- Aeon Dory 115/125
- Aeon Ai-1 series
- Aeon Ai-2 series
- Aeon Ai-3 series
- Aeon Ai-4 series
- Aeon 3D (rebadge Quadro/Qooder 3D)
- Aeon Brera X (rebadge KL Brera X)
- Aeon EV-C1 (rebadge DotStation EV-C1)
- Aeon Elite series (discontinued)
- Aeon Urban series (discontinued)
- Aeon Echo/Pulsar (discontinued)
- Aeon Regal (discontinued)

== See also ==
- List of companies of Taiwan
- List of Taiwanese automakers
- Automotive industry in Taiwan
