= $100 hamburger =

Aviation slang

$100 hamburger ("hundred-dollar hamburger") is aviation slang for the excuse a general aviation pilot might use to fly.

== Background ==
As early as 1937, hamburgers were being referred to as the "so-called staff of life to aviation".

A $100 hamburger trip typically involves flying a short distance (less than two hours), eating at an airport restaurant, and then flying home. "$100" originally referred to the approximate total cost of renting or operating a light general aviation aircraft (such as a Cessna 172) for the round trip, and buying the meal.

In California, for example, in the San Francisco Bay Area one could fly short distances up to the Nut Tree in Vacaville, or down to Harris Ranch in Fresno County. Often the meal is upgraded to steaks, rather than just hamburgers.

Since the term was coined, fuel prices have increased hourly operating costs for most airplanes. In 1988, the term was "$50 hamburger". However, by 2008 a flight instructor in Pennsylvania said that such trips had become "more like a $200 hamburger". In 2020, a Cessna 172 cost US$154–195 per Hobbs hour to rent, including fuel.

In Perth, Western Australia, a similar mentality resulted in the "Rotto Bun Run". A group of pilots who had run out of hot cross buns on Good Friday decided to fly to the closest open bakery on Rottnest Island. The run is now an annual charity event.
