= Gogoro =

Taiwanese electronics company

Gogoro Inc.
- Type: Public
- Traded as: Nasdaq: GGR
- Industry: Sustainable Urban Transportation and Energy Refueling
- Founded: 2011; 15 years ago
- Founders: Horace Luke; Matt Taylor
- Headquarters: Taoyuan, Taiwan
- Key people: Horace Luke (CEO)
- Products: Gogoro Network; Gogoro Smartscooter
- Revenue: 3.5 renminbi (2023)
- Number of employees: 2400
- Website: gogoro.com

Gogoro Inc. is a Taiwanese company that developed a battery-swapping refueling platform for urban electric two-wheel scooters, mopeds and motorcycles. It also develops its own line of electric scooters and offers its own vehicle innovations to vehicle maker partners like Yamaha, Aeon Motor, PGO, eReady, and eMOVING. Gogoro also operates GoShare, a rideshare service, in Taiwan and Ishigaki Island in Japan.

Gogoro Smartscooter, the first consumer product from Gogoro, was revealed at the Consumer Electronics Show (CES) in Las Vegas in January 2015. Along with the scooter, Gogoro announced a battery-swapping network under the name Gogoro Energy Network.

== History ==
Gogoro was founded in 2011 by entrepreneurs Horace Luke and Matt Taylor. In its year of inception, Gogoro secured $50 million in seed funding from Dr. Samuel Yin of Ruentex Group and Cher Wang. In October 2014, Gogoro raised an additional $100 million in Series B funding from a collection of investors. In November 2015, Gogoro announced a $30 million round of investment from Panasonic and Taiwan's National Development Fund. In September 2017, Gogoro announced a $300 million Series C round of investment from Singapore's Temasek, Generation Investment Management (co-founded by Al Gore), Japan's Sumitomo Corporation, and French utility Engie, increasing the Smartscooter innovator's capital up to US$480 million. The company went public in 2022 with its merger with Nasdaq-listed special-purpose acquisition company Poema Global.

On April 21, 2021, Gogoro announced a strategic partnership with the world's top two-wheel vehicle maker, Hero MotoCorp, to roll out its Gogoro Network battery swapping in India.

In December 2020, analyst firm Frost & Sullivan recognized Gogoro as the 2020 Global Company of the Year Award for the Swappable Battery Electric Scooter Market.

In June 2024, the Castrol lubricants division of multinational oil giant BP announced plans to invest up to $50M in Gogoro.

In September 2024, Gogoro's CEO and chairman Horace Luke had stepped down amid subsidy fraud allegations.

On October 1, 2024, Taiwan's Ministry of Economic Affairs released its review conclusion and stated that there was insufficient evidence to determine that the reported vehicle model violated localization regulations.

== Gogoro Network ==
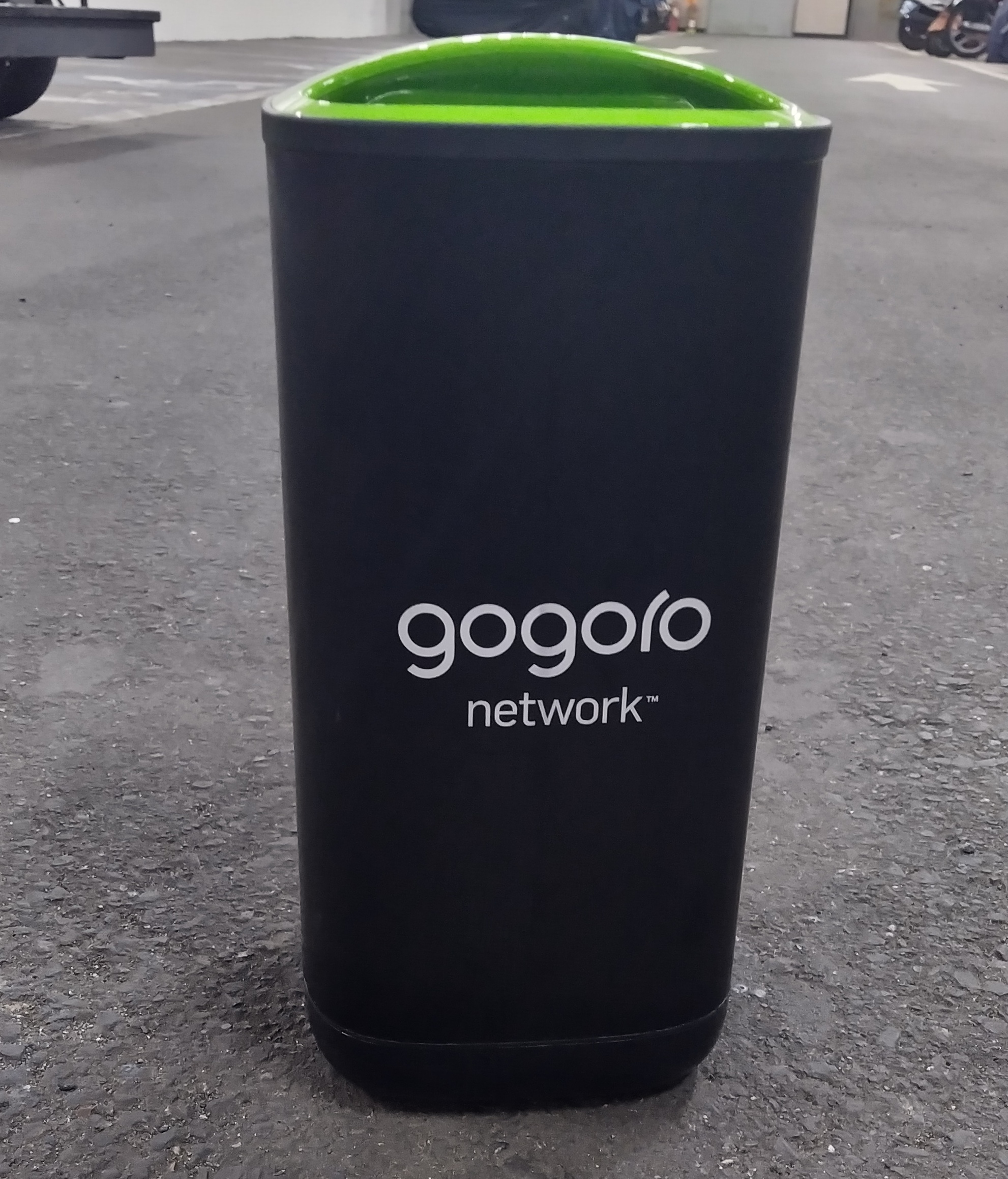
Gogoro Network Smart Battery

The Gogoro Network is a modular battery swapping infrastructure designed to be deployed in cities for electric refueling of two-wheel vehicles like scooters, mopeds, and motorcycles. Riders would be able to swap out depleted batteries at a network of kiosks called GoStations for a monthly subscription fee. According to Gogoro, as of April 2021 in its pilot market of Taiwan, Gogoro Network had 370,000 riders and managed more than 175 million battery swaps, 265,000 per day, through its 2,000 GoStations.

The Gogoro Smartscooter was the first vehicle to be integrated into the Gogoro Network in 2015.

The network also includes the Powered by Gogoro Network (PBGN) program, through which other manufacturers of electric motor scooters can build scooters that utilize the Gogoro Network infrastructure. Gogoro has several vehicle maker partners participating in PBGN, including:

- Aeon Motor
- Awayspeed (ADATA)
- Dachangjiang (Haojue)
- eMOVING (China Motor Co.)
- eReady (Suzuki Taiwan)
- Gogoro
- Hero MotoCorp
- Yadea
- Yamaha
- PGO

=== Asia ===
==== Taiwan ====
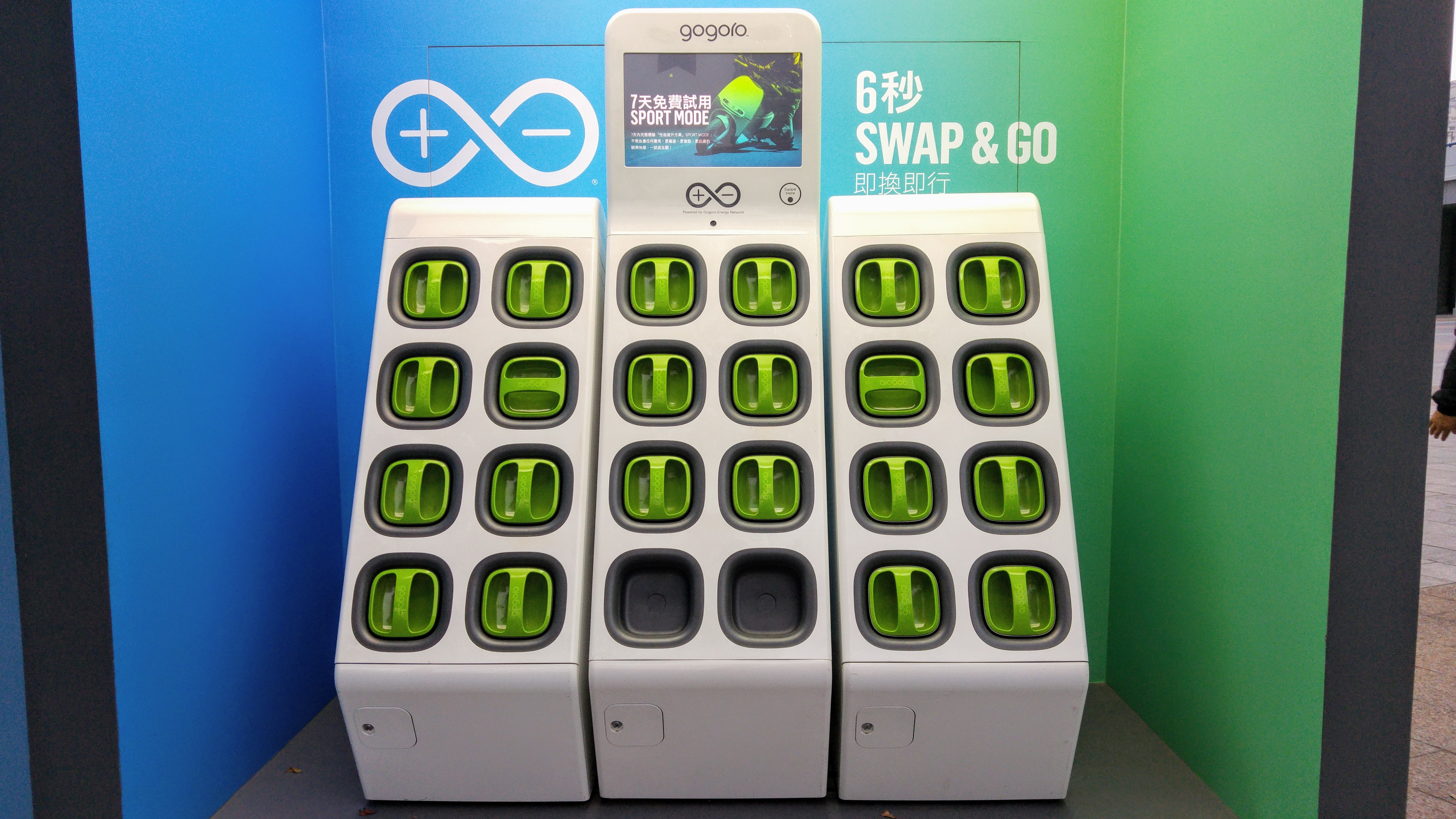
GoStation

In July 2015, Gogoro Smartscooter was launched in Taiwan, a country with the highest scooter density in the world. By the end of the same year, more than 4,000 Smartscooters were sold, and its market share in Taiwan's electric scooter market hit 33.94%. According to Gogoro, in 2016 the company had a GoStation less than every 1.3 kilometers in Taipei.

In February 2021, the network consisted of 1,959 GoStations and more than 764,000 battery packs. 66 of the GoStations in 2021 were Super GoStations which were larger than regular GoStations with the ability to service up to 1,000 riders a day. Some stations have grid batteries, able to keep charging scooter batteries during grid failures.

==== China ====
In October 2021, Gogoro Network launched in Hangzhou, China under the Huan Huan brand, with 45 GoStations in partnership with Yadea and Dachangjiang Group. It has since expanded to Wuxi and Kunming, with 250 swapping stations in China as of September 2022. In November 2022, Gogoro announced it would delay its expansion plans in China due to economic and geopolitical uncertainty.

==== Indonesia ====
In December 2021, Gogoro launched a pilot program in Jakarta with Gojek, with 250 Smartscooters and 4 GoStations.

==== Singapore ====
In September 2022, Gogoro was awarded a sandbox pilot by Singapore's Land Transport Authority (LTA) to launch Smartscooters and battery-swapping technology.

==== India ====
On November 3, 2022, Gogoro announced a battery-swapping pilot in Delhi in partnership with Zypp Electric, a delivery company. The network began operation on November 8, 2022.

In January 2023, Gogoro announced a partnership with Belrise Industries and the state of Maharashtra to invest $2.5 billion in battery charging and swapping infrastructure.

==== The Philippines ====
On November 29, 2022, Gogoro announced a battery-swapping pilot in Manila in partnership with Ayala Corporation, with plans to launch in the first quarter of 2023.

==== Nepal ====
In April 2024, Gogoro will be launching in Kathmandu, Nepal in partnership with Nebula Energy, a Nepalese company. Nebula Energy will be the authorized and exclusive dealer of Gogoro products including the network in Nepal.

=== Outside Asia ===
==== Israel ====
Israel is one of the first markets outside of Taiwan that Gogoro has explored. In September 2022, Gogoro launched its Smartscooters and battery swapping technology in Tel Aviv, with plans to expand into other Israeli cities in the near future.

==== Colombia ====
Gogoro will market its own scooters in Colombia starting in June 2024. The first four battery swapping stations will be colocated at Terpel service stations in Bogotá, with plans to eventually expand to other cities, including Medellín.

== Products ==
=== Gogoro 1 Smartscooter ===
Released in 2015. The Gogoro Smartscooter is an electric scooter designed for urban transportation. It is powered by an electric motor developed by Gogoro, which is marketed as the G1 Aluminum Liquid Cooled Permanent Magnet Synchronous Motor. Instead of plugging into an outlet to recharge, the Smartscooter uses swappable battery packs which are made with Panasonic lithium ion 18650 cells.

=== Gogoro 2 Smartscooter ===
Released in 2017. The second model of Gogoro. The company states the following figures for the Smartscooter based on internal testing: The Smartscooter's sensors collect information such as speed, battery level, consumption rate, system failures, and scooter falls. This information is presented to riders via Gogoro mobile apps.

=== Gogoro Viva ===
In September 2019, Gogoro unveiled the Viva Smartscooter, a smaller electric scooter that provided a smaller option for customers.

== Partners ==
Gogoro has announced the following strategic partnerships:

- Hero MotoCorp: on April 21, 2021, Gogoro announced a strategic partnership with the world's top two-wheel vehicle maker, Hero MotoCorp, to rollout its battery Gogoro Network battery swapping in India.
- Coup Mobility GmbH: an electric scooter sharing service using Gogoro scooters that operated in Berlin, Tübingen, Paris and Madrid between 2016 and 2020 but was closed for economic reasons.
- Tier Mobility GmbH: electric scooter sharing service operating in Berlin, Cologne, Munich and Hamburg. Tier acquired the assets of Coup in early-2020.
- Ride Go Share: electric scooter sharing service in Okinawa, Japan
- Carbon belts: developed in partnership with Gates
- Performance tires: developed in partnership with Maxxis
- Battery cells: developed in partnership with Panasonic

== See also ==
- List of companies of Taiwan
- Battery electric vehicle
- Battery swapping
- Honda Mobile Power Pack
- Charging station
- Electric car
- Electric car use by country
- List of modern production plug-in electric vehicles
- Plug-in electric vehicle
- Ather Energy
- Renault Fluence Z.E.
