= John C. Harris =

American businessman (1943–2025)

John C. Harris (July 14, 1943 – July 3, 2025) was an American horse breeder and businessman who was the owner of Harris Farms and was a onetime president and, until his death, a member of the executive committee of the California Thoroughbred Breeders Association. A member of the California Horse Racing Board (CHRB), he served as chairman of the CHRB for the years 2004, 2005 and 2009, and was a director of the Thoroughbred Owners of California. Harris was a member of The Jockey Club beginning in 1988. He died on July 2, 2025, at the age of 81.

Harris Farms, founded in 1937, is one of the United States' leading producers of agricultural products. Harris Ranch Beef Company produces nearly 200 million pounds (90,700,000 kg) of beef and is California's largest fed cattle processor. California's leading breeder of thoroughbreds, Harris Farms stood ten stallions in 2010, including Cee's Tizzy, sire of two-time Breeders' Cup Classic winner Tiznow; Redattore; and Swiss Yodeler.

Prior to releasing the Fall 2025 Santa Anita Park Stakes schedule the track administration announced that the Grade III Unzip Me Stakes would be renamed to the John C. Harris Stakes in honor of John C. Harris. John C. Harris was co-owner and bred Unzip Me in partnership.
