= Horace Luke =

Taiwanese entrepreneur (born 1970)

- 陸學森
- Born: 1970 (age 55–56); British Hong Kong
- Education: University of Washington (BA, BFA)
- Known for: Co-Founder and CEO of Gogoro

Horace Luke (Chinese name: 陸學森) is a Taiwanese entrepreneur and businessman, co-founder and former CEO of Gogoro, an electric scooter and battery swapping company.

== Early life and education ==
Luke was born in Hong Kong and moved to Washington at age 13. Luke attended the University of Washington, studying industrial design.

== Career ==
In 1997, he joined Microsoft and contributed to the creation of the original Xbox, and then served as the creative director of Microsoft's mobile platform product group. Luke served as the Chief Innovation Officer at HTC until July 2011. In the same year, he founded Gogoro in Taiwan with Matt Taylor.
