= Harris Ranch =

California's largest beef producer

Coordinates: 36.343°N 120.215°W

- Industry: Beef producer
- Founded: 1937
- Founder: Jack Harris
- Headquarters: Fresno County, California, United States
- Area served: United States
- Products: Beef
- Owner: John C. Harris
- Number of employees: 400
- Parent: Harris Farms
- Website: www.harrisranchbeef.com

A Harris Ranch sign in Coalinga, California, displaying the Harris Ranch logo similar to all Harris Ranch packaging

Harris Ranch Restaurant

Harris Ranch or the Harris Cattle Ranch feedlot is California's largest beef producer, producing 150 million pounds (68 kt) of beef per year in 2010. It is located in Fresno County alongside Interstate 5 at its intersection with State Route 198 east of Coalinga, in the San Joaquin Valley of central California. The ranch is owned by Harris Farms.

== Description ==
=== History ===
Founded by Jack Harris in 1937, the Harris Ranch Beef Company (now operated by Jack Harris' son John) was originally a cotton and grain operation. In the 1970s the ranch opened a burger stand near Interstate 5.

The farm also operates an inn and restaurant, raises fruit and vegetable crops, and breeds thoroughbred horses. Overall, the operation has more than 400 employees. Approximately 14,000 acres (5,700 ha) are devoted to garlic, broccoli, pomegranates, and tomatoes, among 35 types of fruits and vegetables.

In January 2012, an arsonist destroyed fourteen cattle trucks on the ranch. The Animal Liberation Front claimed responsibility.

=== Marketing and distribution ===
At over 800 acres (320 ha) and with a population of over 100,000 cattle, and hundreds harvested daily, the ranch is the largest on the West Coast. It is also among the largest (when including density) in the United States. A vertically integrated operation, it owns a fleet of trucks that take cattle from several ranches with which it deals, and does its own finishing, slaughtering, and packaging.

The ranch supplies the hamburger meat for the In-N-Out Burger chain, and also distributes beef and prepared meals through grocery stores and restaurants nationwide.

Harris Ranch was one of the first to build a brand around itself as a specialty niche product, and is credited as a forerunner of companies like Niman Ranch and Dakota Beef.

=== Restaurant and inn ===
The restaurant was targeted to local farmers when it opened in 1977, but later became popular as a halfway stop on the busy highway connecting San Francisco and Los Angeles. A 153-room luxury inn was added in 1987. It was built in hacienda-style. The restaurant evolved into a "farm to fork" concept in the late 2000s, featuring not only beef but wine and other products made locally by the ranch. As of 2008 the restaurant was the 57th busiest in the United States and sixth busiest in California based on gross receipts. The site was chosen for a hydrogen vehicle fuel station as well as one of the first battery swapping Tesla stations. Later, 18 superchargers were added. Then, in 2021 an expansion of 80 more V3 superchargers was planned for 2022, making it the world's largest supercharger location.

=== Public reception ===
The ranch is known to travelers for the "ripe, tangy odor of cow manure", described alternately as a "horrible stench" and "a good, honest, American smell". This smell inspired food writer Michael Pollan to conduct the research on factory farming that led to his sustainability book, The Omnivore's Dilemma. The owner of Harris Ranch, in turn, threatened to withhold a $500,000 donation to California Polytechnic State University, San Luis Obispo if it sponsored a speech there by Pollan. In reference to the large number of cattle processed at its facilities, some critics have nicknamed the ranch "Cowschwitz", comparing the slaughtering of cattle to the slaughtering of Jews during the Holocaust at the Auschwitz concentration camp. Animal behavior expert Temple Grandin described the nickname as a matter of public misperception, saying that the company "does a great job" of keeping its animals.

== See also ==
- Harris Ranch Airport

== Gallery ==
Harris Ranch Inn

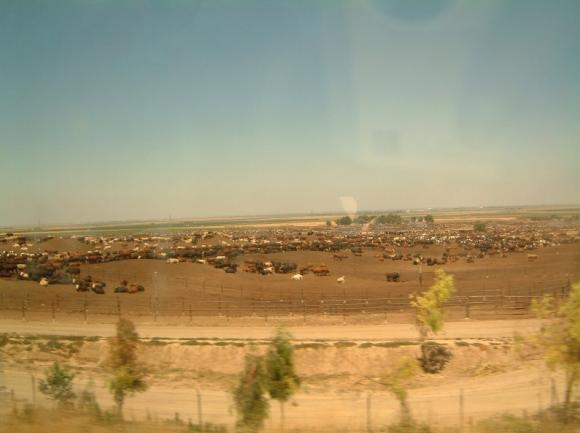
For most travelers, the feedlot is the most recognizable view (and smell) of Harris Ranch from Interstate 5.
