= Battery swapping =

Systems for exchanging flat batteries

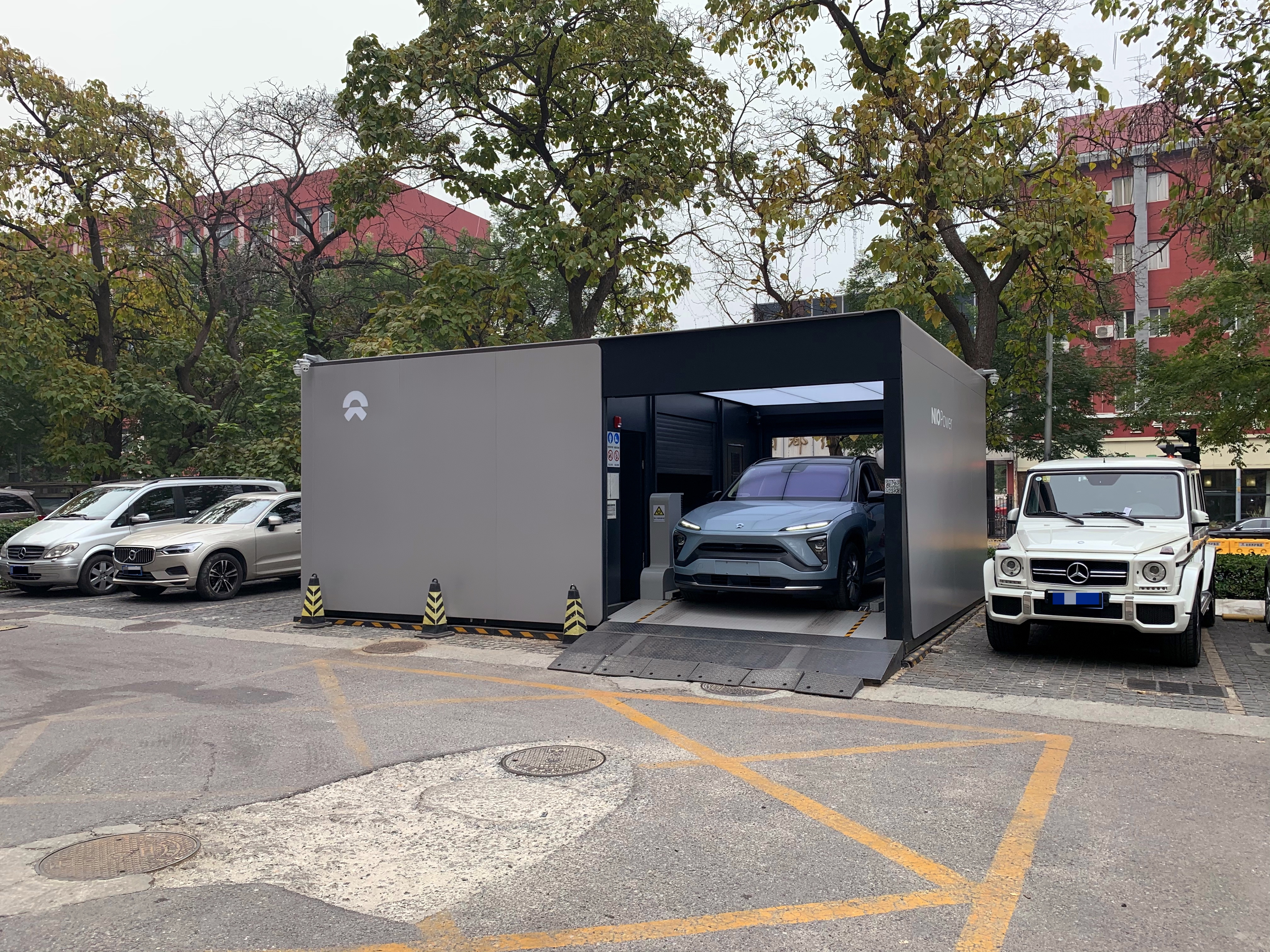
A Nio battery swap station at a carpark in Beijing.

Battery swapping or battery switching is an electric vehicle technology that allows battery electric vehicles to quickly exchange a discharged battery pack for a fully charged one, rather than recharging the vehicle via a charging station. Battery swapping is common in electric forklift applications.

As of 2021, Taiwanese electric scooter manufacturer Gogoro operates the largest battery swap network for electric mopeds, with nearly 11,000 GoStations in Taiwan, and 250 in Mainland China. Chinese luxury carmaker Nio is the only major operator of automobile battery swapping stations for the public. The company has built around 2250 battery swap stations around China and Europe, and the process takes three minutes from start to finish. Previously, Renault and Tesla attempted to make their vehicles capable of swapping batteries.

== History ==
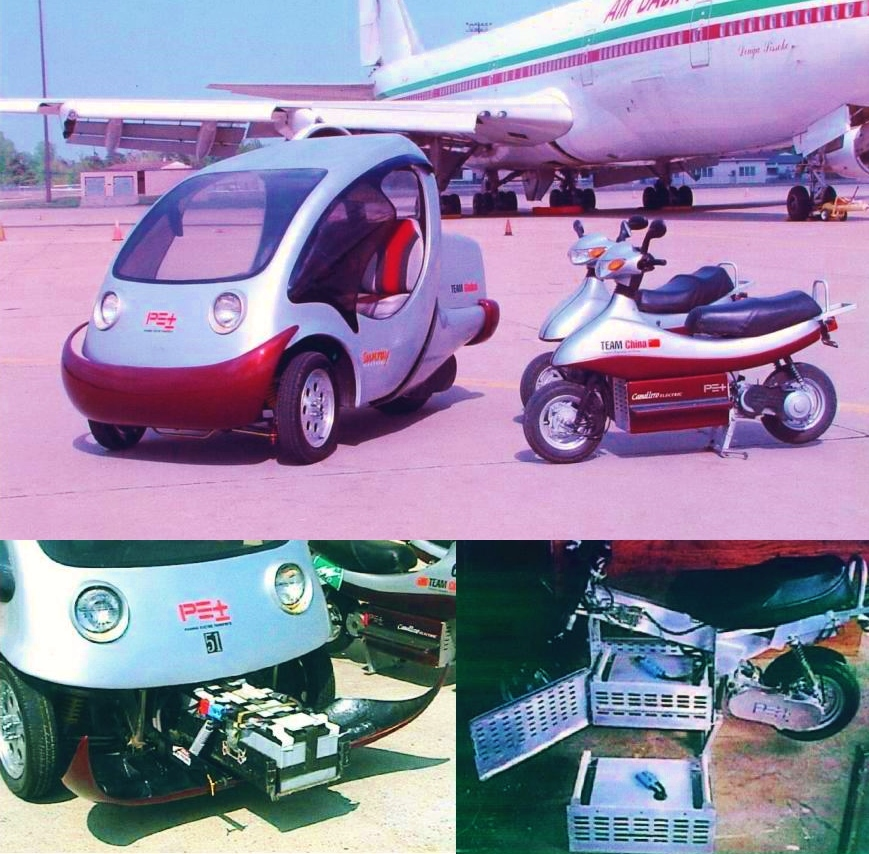
The SunRay and Caballito on their way to Micronesia for a conference on global warming.

The concept of an exchangeable battery service was proposed as early as 1896. It was first offered between 1910 and 1924, by Hartford Electric Light Company, through the GeVeCo battery service, serving electric trucks. The vehicle owner purchased the vehicle, without a battery, from General Vehicle Company (GeVeCo), part-owned by General Electric. The power was purchased from Hartford Electric in the form of an exchangeable battery. The vehicles and batteries were designed to facilitate a fast exchange. The owner paid a variable per-mile charge and a monthly service fee to cover truck maintenance and storage. These vehicles covered more than 6 million miles.

Beginning in 1917 and lasting a few years, a similar service operated in Chicago for owners of Milburn Electric cars.

In 1993, Suntera developed a two-seat 3-wheel electric vehicle called the SUNRAY, which came with a battery cartridge that swapped out in minutes at a battery-swap station. In 1995, Suntera added a motor scooter. The company was later renamed Personal Electric Transports(P.E.T.). After 2000 the company developed an electric bus. In 2004, the company's 3-wheel stand-up EV won 1st place at the 5-day long American Tour de Sol electric vehicle race, before closing in 2006.

A rapid battery replacement system was implemented to service 50 electric buses at the 2008 Summer Olympics.

Some smaller schemes have attempted to popularize battery swapping with individual cities. Zotye Auto built a fleet of 15 of M300 EV hatchbacks for a taxi fleet in Hangzhou, China. In 2011, one of these vehicles caught on fire after the battery pack in the trunk caught fire. An investigation later found that battery in question, as well as the connecting electronics in the truck, had become worn out from repeated loading and unloading of charged battery packs. The electric scheme was halted following the incident.

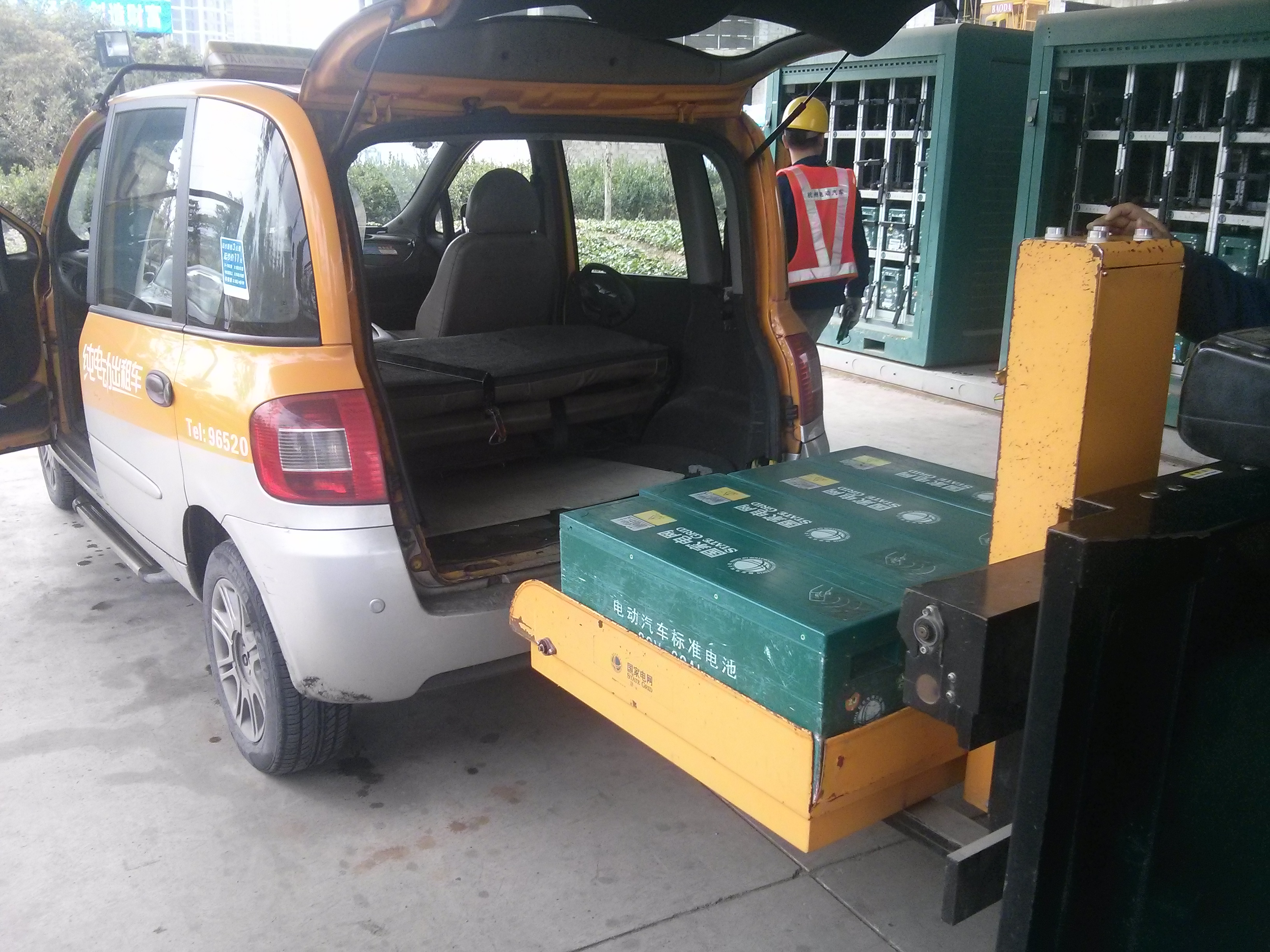
A Zotye M300 EV having its batteries replaced.

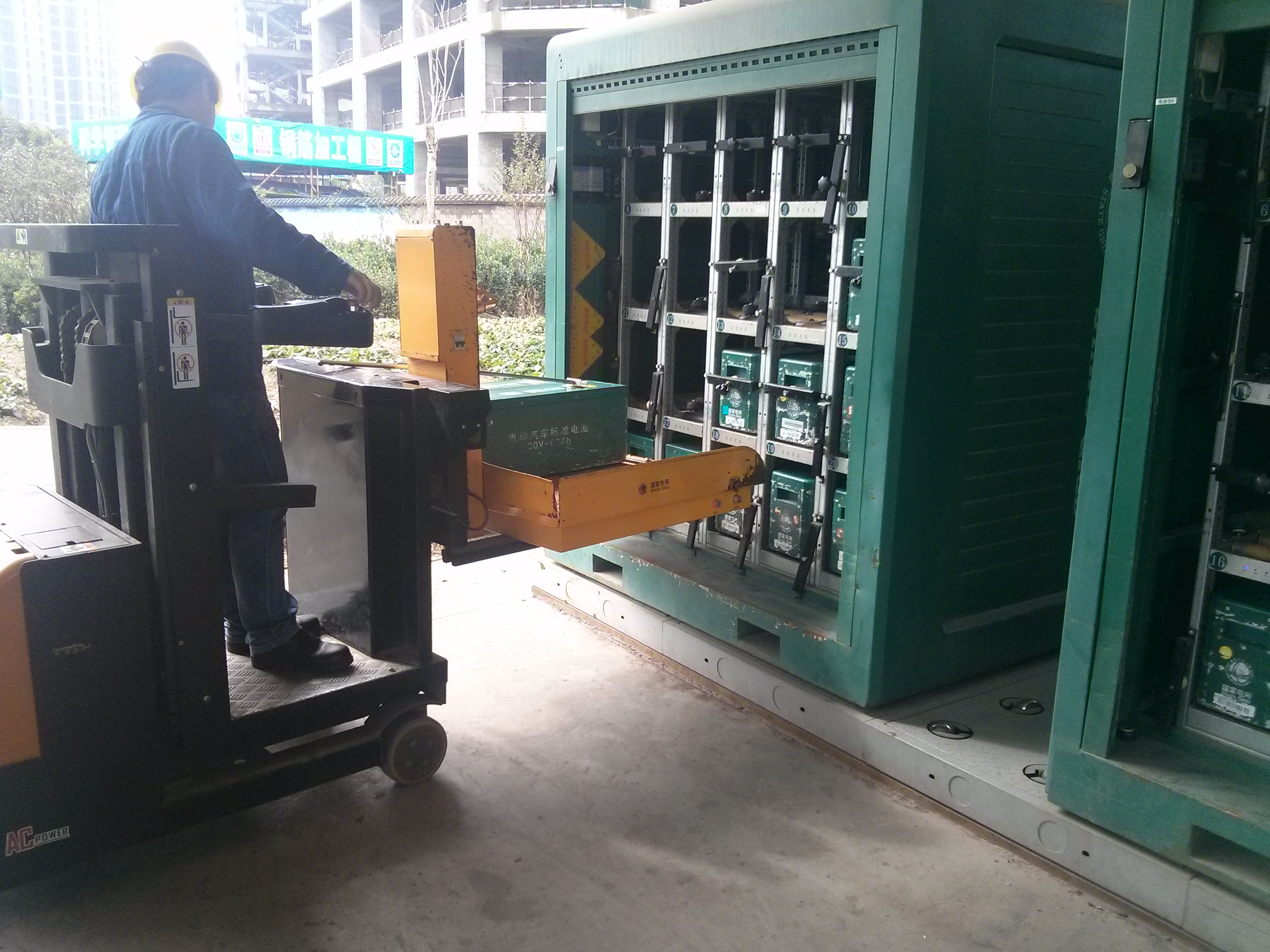
The batteries of a Zotye M300 EV being charged before being swapped.

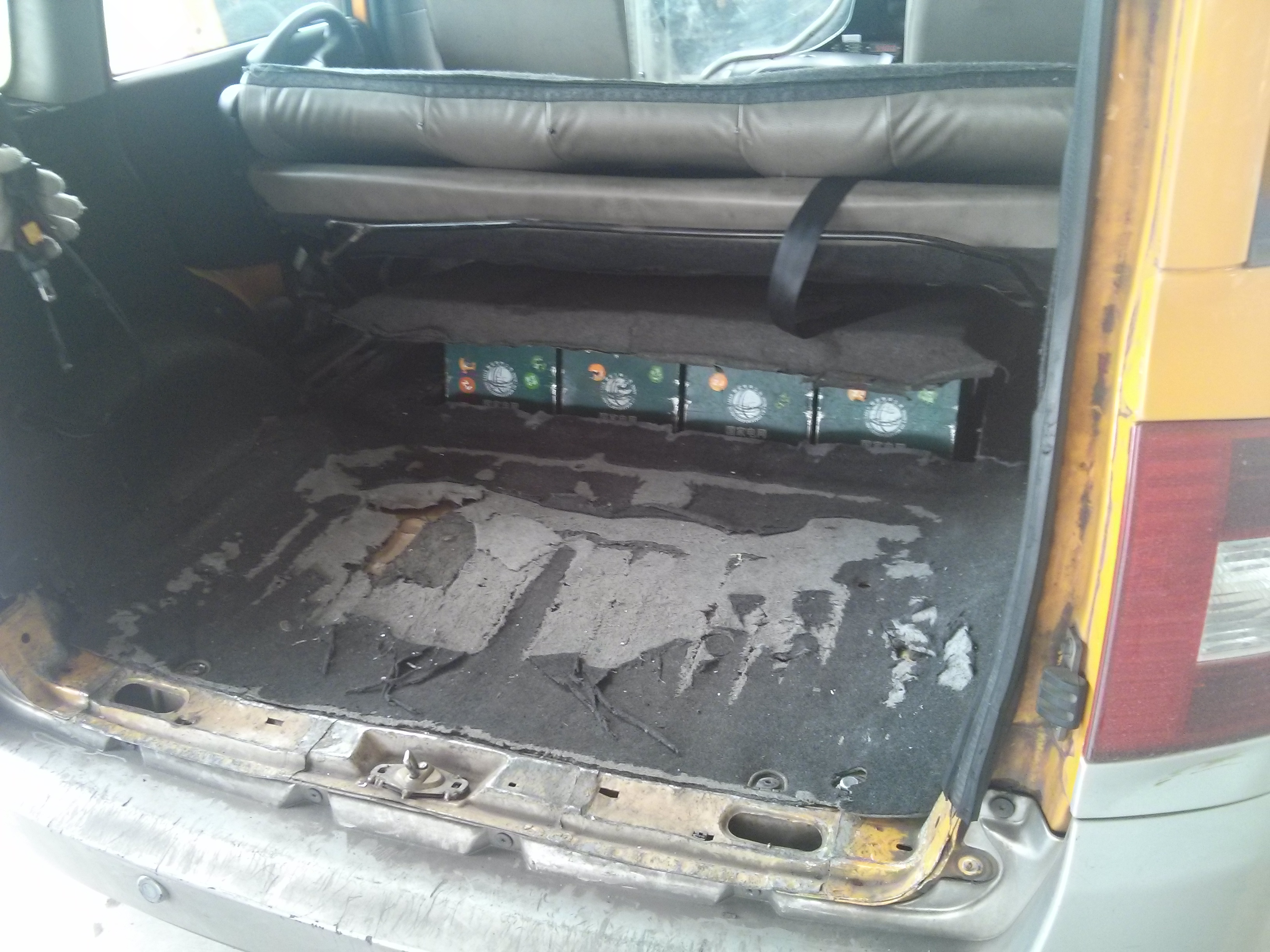
Wear and tear in the battery compartment of a Zotye M300 EV, located in the trunk.

The Better Place network was the first modern attempt at making the battery switching model mainstream. The Renault Fluence Z.E. was the first car enabled to adopt the approach and was offered in several countries, including those where no battery swap stations had been planned.

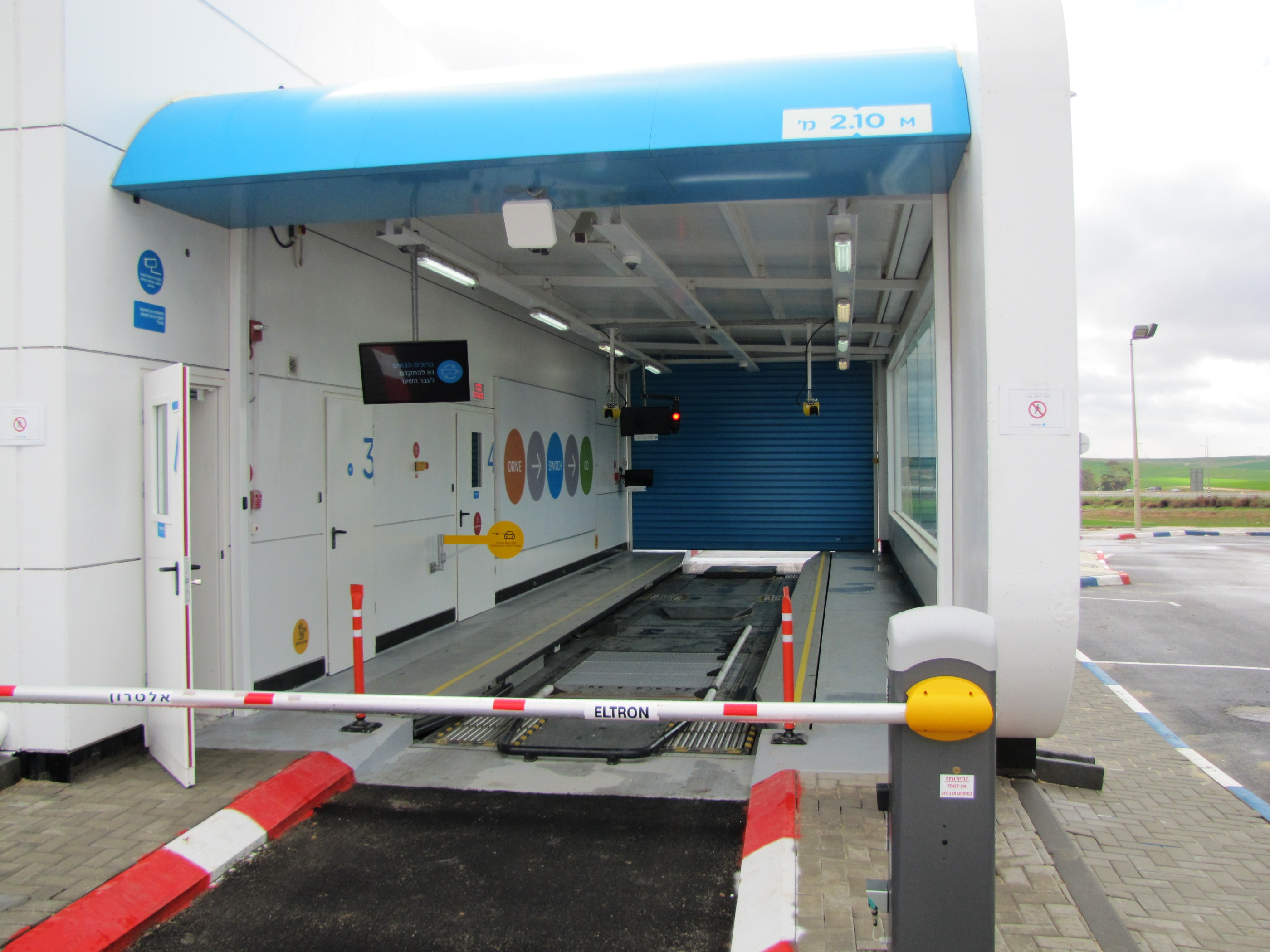
A Better Place battery switching station near Dvir, Israel.

Better Place launched its first battery-swapping station in Israel, in Kiryat Ekron, near Rehovot in March 2011. The exchange process took five minutes. Subsequent battery swap stations were built in Denmark. Better Place filed for bankruptcy in Israel in May 2013.

In 2012, Tesla started building a proprietary fast-charging Tesla Supercharger network. A year later, in June 2013, Tesla announced its plan to offer battery swapping. Tesla showed that a battery swap with the Model S took just over 90 seconds. Elon Musk said the service would be offered at around US$60 to US$80 at June 2013 prices. The vehicle purchase included one battery pack. After a swap, the owner could later return and receive their battery pack fully charged. A second option would be to keep the swapped battery and receive/pay the difference in value between the original and the replacement. Pricing was not announced. In 2015 the company abandoned its sole swapping station, built at Harris Ranch, for lack of customer interest.

Other battery swapping service providers include Gogoro, Delta Electronics, BattSwap,, Voltia, and Swap & Go. In Southeast Asia, notable companies such as Oyika and Volta focuses on networks for electric motorcycles, offering quick battery swaps and a Battery-as-a-Service (BaaS) model in emerging markets such as Indonesia, Malaysia, and Thailand. By early 2022, Nio had built more than 850 swap stations in China, up from 131 in 2020. A station can cost $772,000 in China. A 90 kWh battery is charged at 60 kW and can be swapped in 6 minutes. China operates cement trucks where the heavy battery is swapped. A battery swap system with a 2 MWh battery in each 20-foot (6.1 m) shipping container powering a converted canal barge began operating in the Netherlands in 2021.

In France, companies like ZEWAY have implemented a battery swapping system for their electric scooters, enabling instant recharging in just 50 seconds through a network of battery swapping stations. This approach is gaining ground, especially in urban areas, as it promotes sustainable transportation while addressing the limitations of traditional battery charging methods. In 2024, ZEWAY reached 1,000,000 swaps and became the European leader in battery swapping.

== Criticism ==
In 2013, CNET reviewer Wayne Cunningham criticized battery swapping solutions as proprietary, with concerns over promotion of the Tesla Model S mentioning "Tesla stations" for swapping. With a monopoly of ownership of the batteries and incompatible patent-protected technologies, the companies could split the market and decrease the chances of wider usage of battery swapping.

== Gallery ==
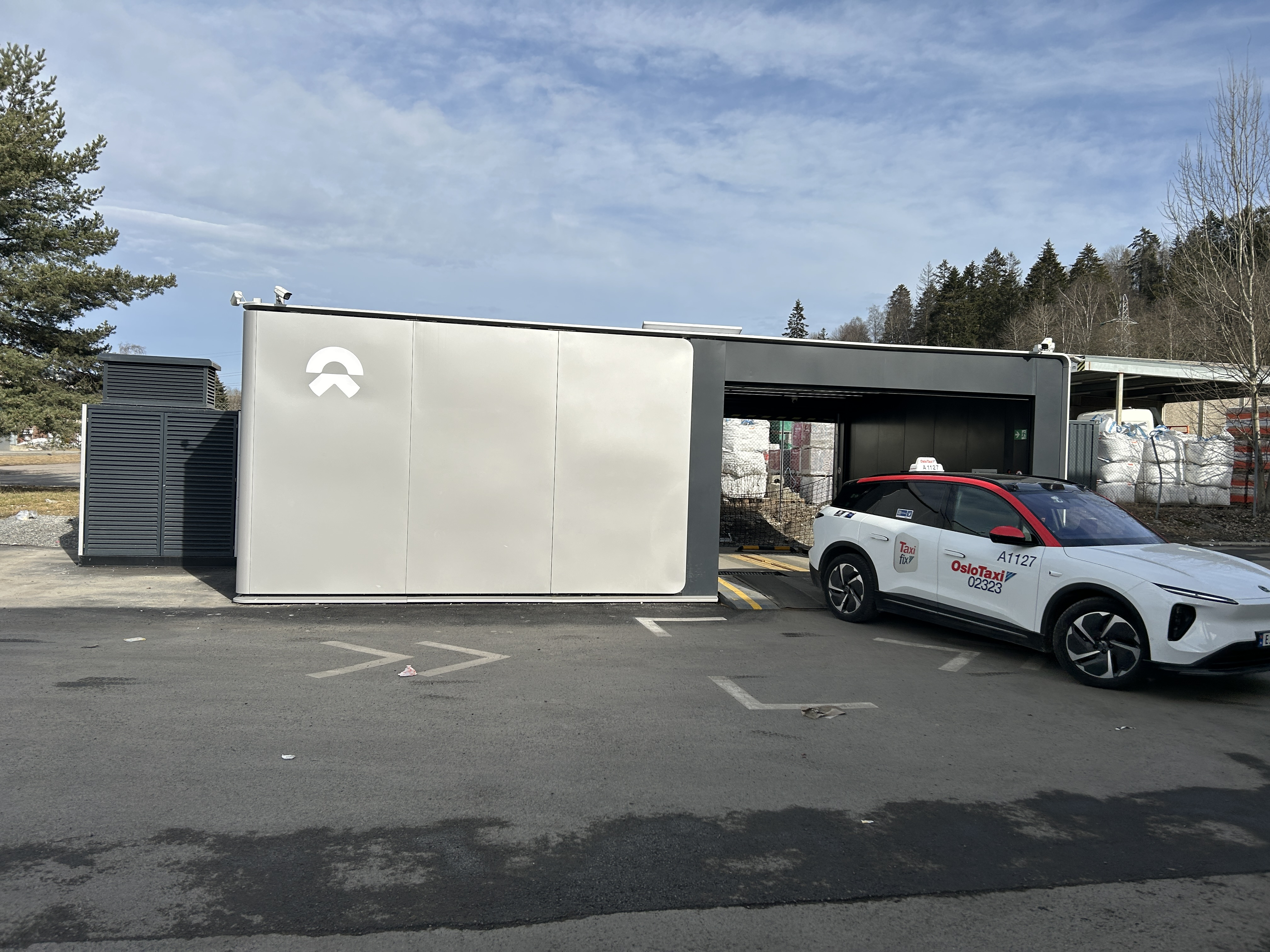
Battery Swap Station used by a taxi in Oslo, Norway.

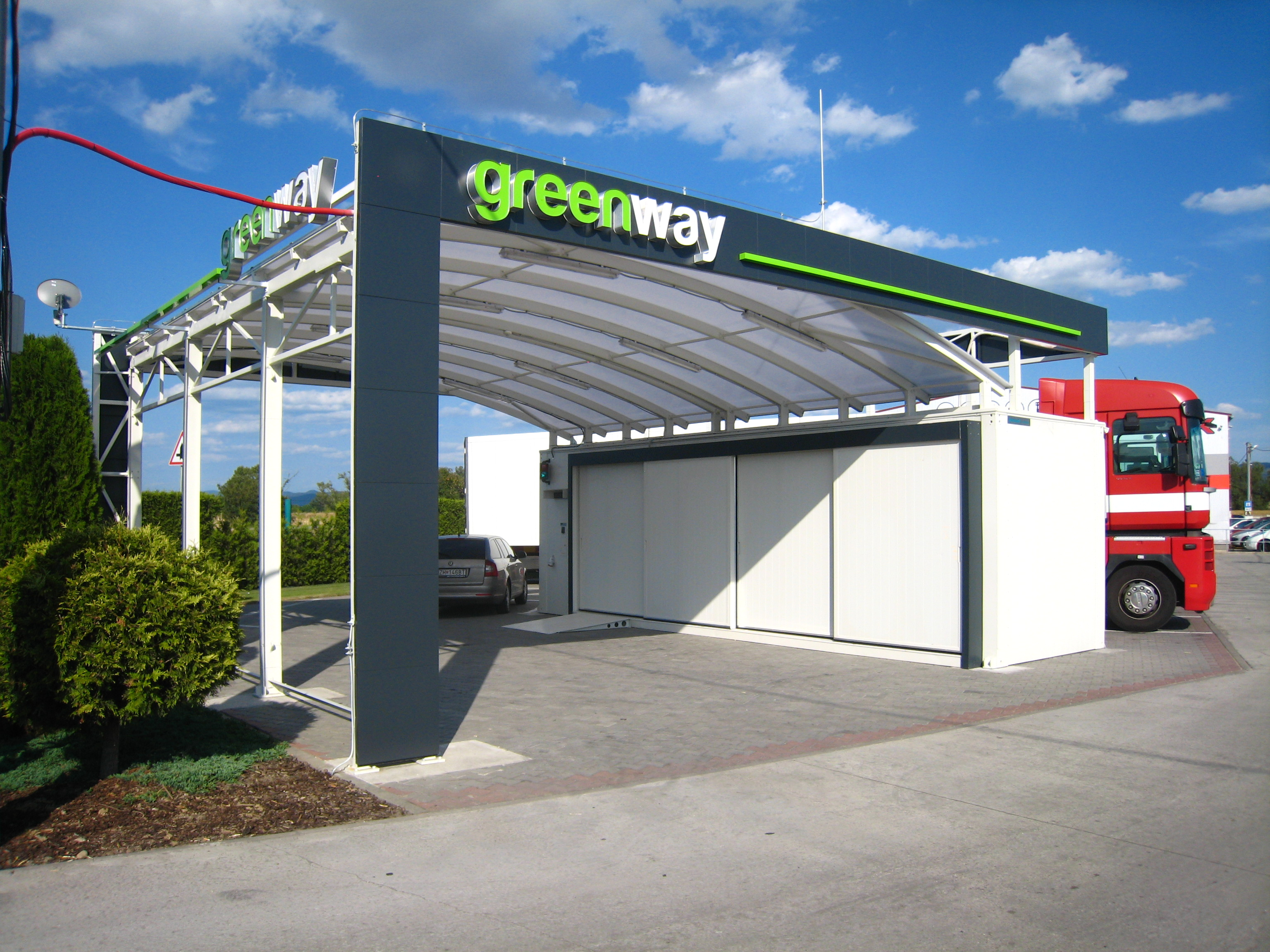
Battery Swap Station for light commercial vehicles in Slovakia.

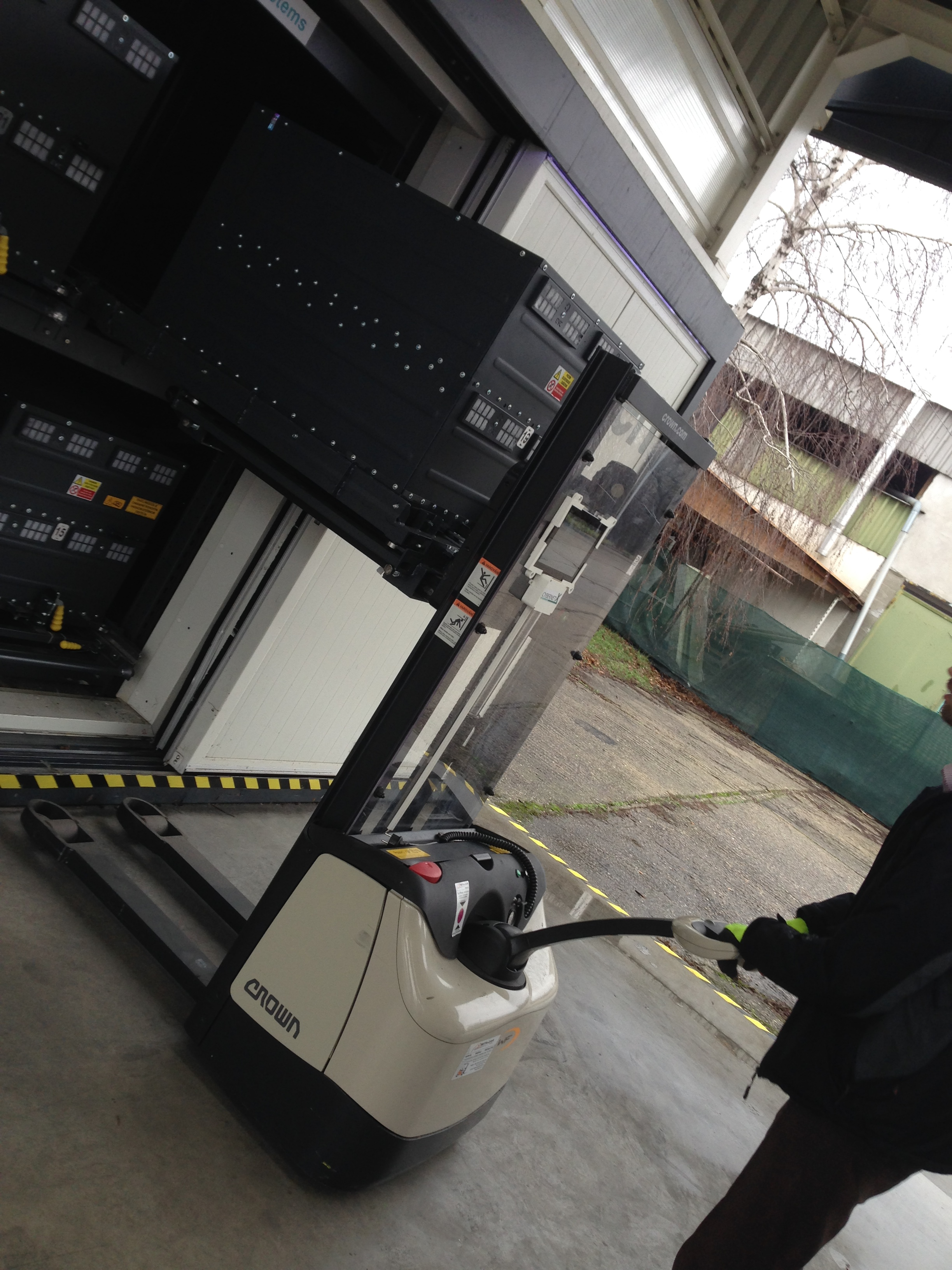
Loading a Voltia electric LKW battery pack.

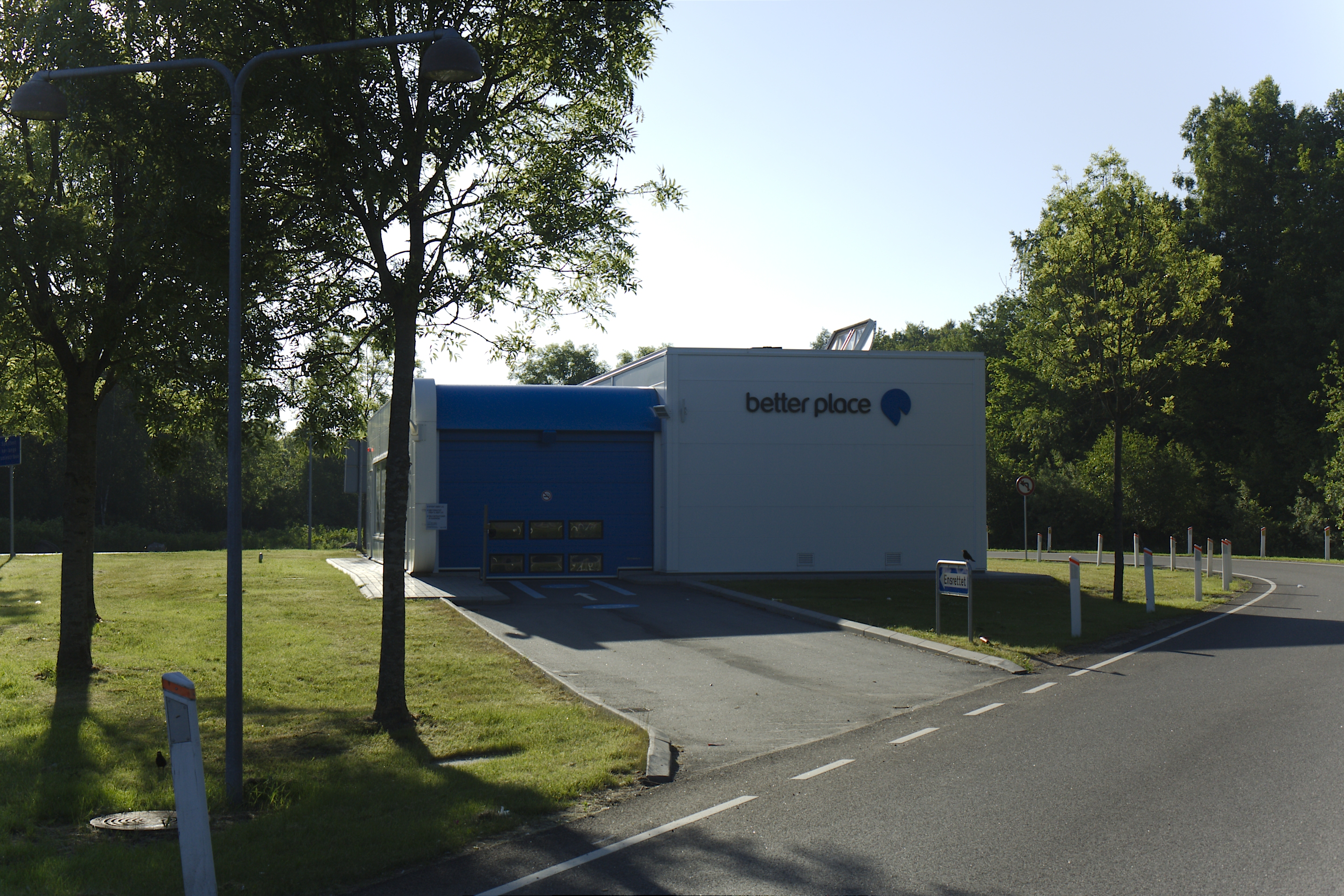
A shuttered Better Place batter swap station in Funen, Denmark.

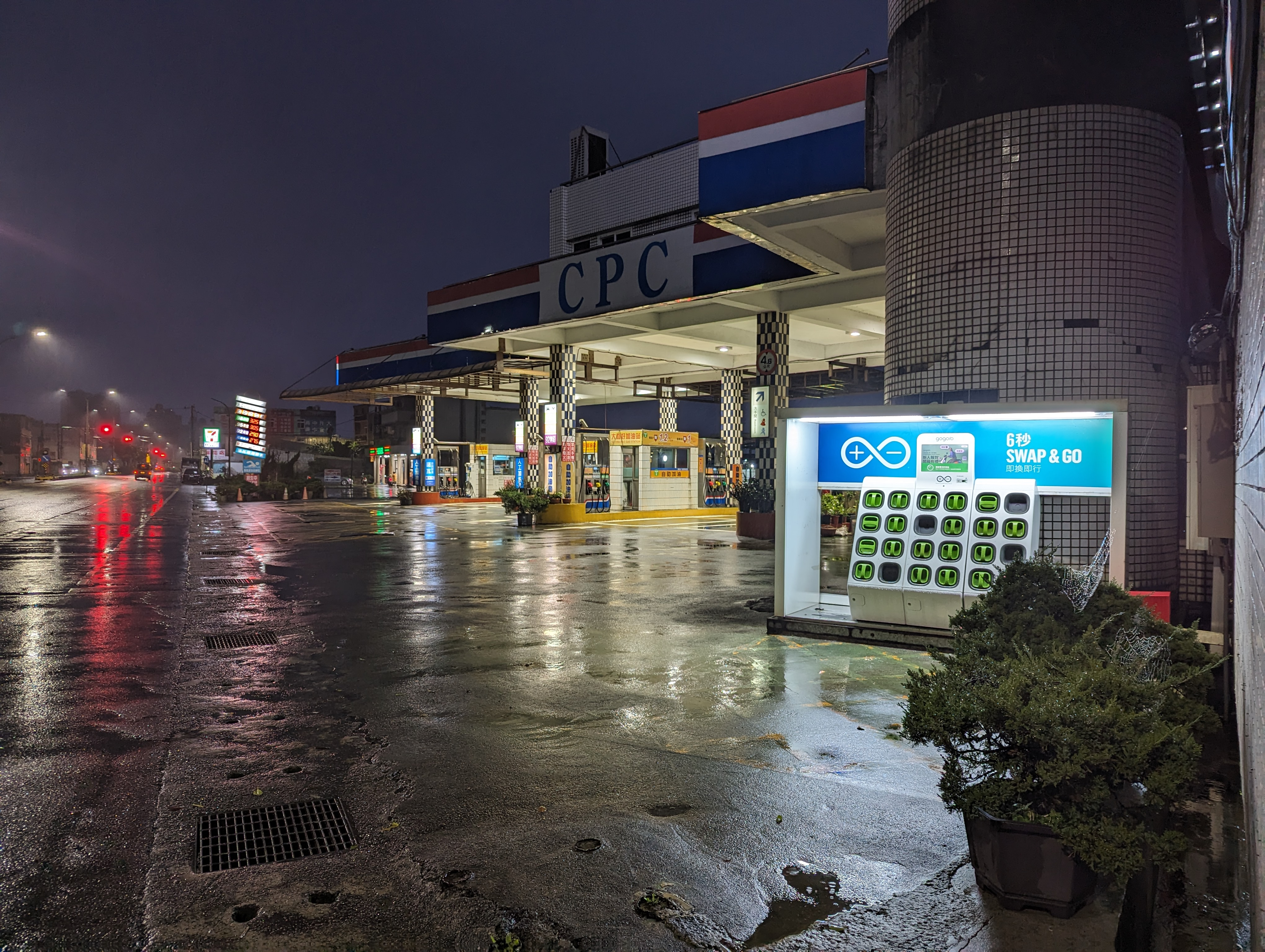
Gogoro GoStation, colocated at a CPC petrol station in Sanzhi District, New Taipei City
