= Dakota Beef =

American organic beef company

Dakota Grass-Fed Beef is an American organic beef producer, providing grass-fed and grass-finished beef made from cattle that never receive added hormones or antibiotics. Cattle are raised on pastures without pesticides.

The company provides organic grass-fed steaks, ground beef, corned beef brisket, and hot dogs to major supermarkets, natural foods stores, distributors, and food service accounts across the United States. The grass-fed ground beef is sold directly to consumers online at Meyer Market.

Dakota Beef is owned by Bob Meyer and is part of the Meyer Natural Foods family of brands, with headquarters in Loveland, Colorado. Dakota Beef was added to the Meyer portfolio in 2010. Dakota Beef holds an organic certification with the USDA and uses the USDA Organic seal on packaging.
