= Tesla charger =

Tesla charger may refer to:

- North American Charging System created by Tesla and used by many of its vehicles
- Tesla Supercharger stations
