= North American Charging Standard =

Electric vehicle connector standard

North American Charging Standard North American Charging System (SAE J3400)
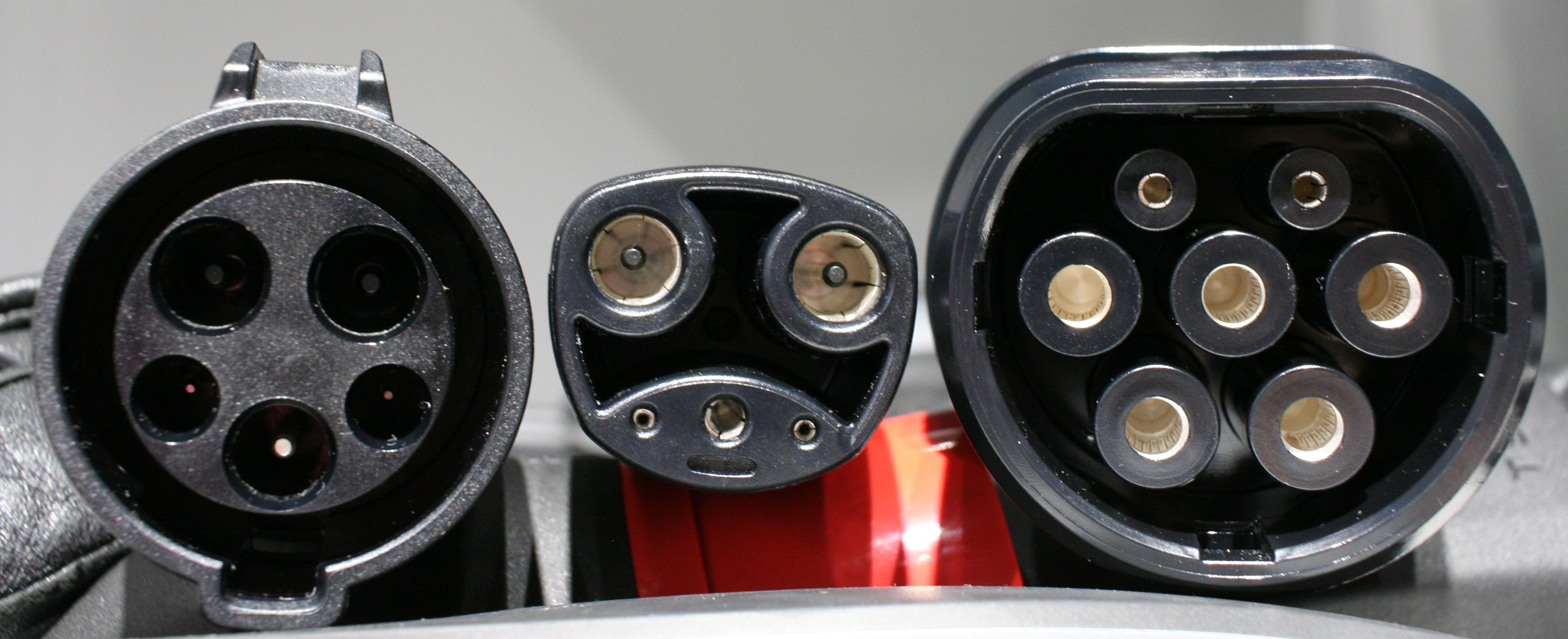
- Comparison of charging connectors, from left to right: J1772 (AC), NACS (AC/DC), and Type 2 (AC). Non-NACS DC connectors are larger.
- Type: Electric vehicle charging

Production history
- Designer: Tesla, Inc.
- Designed: 2012
- Standardized: 2023
- Manufacturer: Tesla, Volex

General specifications
- Pins: 5

Electrical
- Signal: AC or DC
- Max. voltage: 277 Volt (V) AC; 500 or 1,000 V DC

Pinout
- Pinout for NACS, looking at connector
DC+/L1	DC+ / Line 1	Positive current (DC), Line 1 (split phase AC), or Line (single phase AC)
DC−/L2	DC− / Line 2	Negative current (DC), Line 2 (split phase AC), or Neutral (single phase AC)
G	Ground	Protective grounding system
CP	Control pilot	Charging state/current signaling
PP	Proximity pilot	Vehicle connector status signaling

The North American Charging Standard (NACS), also known as the North American Charging System and officially designated SAE J3400, is an electric vehicle (EV) charging connector originally developed by Tesla, Inc. and standardized by SAE International. NACS uses a single compact connector for both AC and fast DC charging, sharing common pins for both modes, unlike other systems that require different or larger connectors for DC charging.

Tesla introduced the physical connector design, originally called the Tesla charging connector, with the Model S in 2012. However, it was not until 2021 that Tesla vehicles began supporting the expanded communications protocol that is specified as part of NACS. In 2022, Tesla opened the standard to other manufacturers, naming it the North American Charging Standard. SAE International formally standardized it in 2023 as the North American Charging System with official designation as SAE J3400.

Between May 2023 and February 2024, most major automakers announced plans to adopt NACS for their North American EVs beginning with the 2025 model year, replacing the Combined Charging System Combo 1 (CCS1) connector. Access to the Tesla Supercharger network, regarded as more reliable and extensive than other networks, was cited as a major factor in the transition. Several EV charging network operators and charging equipment manufacturers have also adopted NACS connectors.

== Background ==
After initial testing allowing non-Tesla EVs to use Tesla Supercharger stations in Europe in December 2019, Tesla began to test a proprietary dual-connector "Magic Dock" connector at select North American Supercharger locations in March 2023. Magic Dock allows for an EV to charge with either a NACS or CCS1 connector, which would provide the technical capability for almost all battery electric vehicles the chance to charge. While most of Tesla's North American Supercharger locations currently provide exclusively NACS connectors, 92 locations with V3 posts and 44 with V4 supported the Magic Dock adapter as of February 2025.

== History ==
Tesla developed a proprietary charging connector for the Model S in 2012 and used it on all subsequent vehicles, including the Model X, Model 3, Model Y, and Cybertruck. As part of its business strategy, the company also built the Tesla Supercharger network across the United States.

Following the passage of the Infrastructure Investment and Jobs Act (also known as the Bipartisan Infrastructure Law) in 2021, the U.S. government announced $7.5 billion in subsidies to support the development of a nationwide network of fast chargers at least every 50 miles (80 km) along America's highways. To qualify for funding, chargers were required to be accessible to multiple brands of electric vehicles.

In response, in November 2022, Tesla introduced the North American Charging Standard (NACS), an open standard based on the physical design of its earlier proprietary connector. However, unlike the original Tesla connector, which used CAN bus communication, NACS employs the ISO 15118 protocol used by CCS1, allowing for vehicles with a CCS1 port to charge at a NACS station using an adapter, and allowing Tesla vehicles to charge at a CCS1 station using an adapter. Tesla vehicles built before 2021 require an ECU retrofit to support charging at a CCS1 station. The Supercharger network remains backward compatible with both the original connector and NACS.

Tesla promoted NACS as offering several advantages, including a more compact design, a Tesla vehicle fleet that outnumbered CCS1-equipped vehicles by a margin of two to one, and a Supercharger network with 60 percent more stalls than all CCS1-equipped networks combined. Commentators described the move as a last-ditch effort to save the Tesla connector as federal funding under the Infrastructure Investment and Jobs Act supported the expansion of CCS1 infrastructure.

In May 2023, Ford Motor Company became the first major automaker to announce plans to adopt NACS. Ford stated that beginning in 2025, all new electric vehicles would feature native NACS ports, with earlier models able to use NACS chargers through an adapter starting in 2024. Ford's announcement began a rapid shift in the industry, with other manufacturers making similar announcements throughout 2023 and early 2024, leading to widespread industry adoption.

Observers noted that the broad shift reflected recognition of the Tesla Supercharger network as among the most reliable and extensive, and that NACS offered advantages in design and usability. Analysts also suggested that charging infrastructure could become a recurring revenue source for Tesla.

On June 27, 2023, SAE International announced plans to standardize the NACS connector as SAE J3400. In August 2023, Tesla licensed the design to Volex to manufacture NACS components. SAE published the "technical information report" on December 18, 2023, and the "recommended practice", with "NACS" redefined as the "North American Charging System," on September 30, 2024.

Following widespread industry adoption, the U.S. government publicly endorsed NACS in December 2023. The Federal Highway Administration announced plans to integrate the SAE-standard NACS plug into eligibility criteria for federal charging infrastructure funding.

Tesla officially opened more than 15,000 Supercharger stalls to Ford owners on February 29, 2024. The company reported that technicians had retrofitted many stalls with updated electronics to support both CAN bus and ISO 15118 protocols, enabling compatibility with CCS1-equipped vehicles. Tesla indicated that retrofitting work would continue across its network.

== Description ==
The NACS connector supports both alternating current (AC) charging and direct current (DC) fast charging.

=== Technical specifications ===
The NACS connector is available in two DC configurations: one supporting up to 500 volts (V) and another supporting up to 1000 V. The higher voltage version is backward compatible with the former.

No current limit is specified for NACS. Any amount of current is permissible, provided that the temperature of the connector's interface does not exceed 105 °C (221 °F). Tesla has reported operating the connector at continuous currents up to 900 amperes (amps).

For DC fast charging, the version 4 (V4) Tesla Supercharger delivers up to 500 kilowatts (kW) of power. This requires both a V4 dispenser (plug end) and V4 back end. This setup is only available at a select few locations. In practice, the 500 kW rate can only be sustained for a few minutes before thermal throttling the unit.

For AC charging, the NACS system can supply up to 80 amps at 277 V, derived from a three-phase commercial power supply at 480 V, yielding 22.16 kW. However, in typical configurations, NACS provides up to 48 amps of current at 240 V (the standard residential voltage of the North American split-phase electric power system), yielding 11.5 kW.

=== Operation ===
The NACS connector features a single button located on the top center of the handle. Pressing the button emits a UHF signal. When the connector is securely locked in place, the signal triggers the vehicle to retract the latch that holds the connector in place. If the connector is not locked in place, the signal prompts the vehicle to open the door covering the inlet.

=== Pin layout ===
The NACS connector has a five-pin layout. Two primary pins are used for both AC charging and DC fast charging:

1. DC+/L1: Provides the positive side of the DC voltage link or, in AC mode, serves as Line 1 in a split-phase connection or as the sole line in a single-phase connection.
2. DC−/L2: Provides the negative side of the DC voltage link or, in AC mode, serves as Line 2 in a split-phase connection or as the neutral in a single-phase connection.
3. G (ground): Connects the earth to the vehicle’s chassis. This pin also serves as a reference for the CP and PP signals and is used to measure electrical isolation.
4. CP (control pilot): A digital communication path used to exchange information about charging state and current, in accordance with IEC 61851. Power-line communication is superimposed on the control pilot during DC charging.
5. PP (proximity pilot): Carries a low-voltage signal to determine the connector’s status. When the release button on the plug is pressed, a switch on the proximity pilot circuit opens, interrupting the flow of electricity.

The AC pin layout is identical to that of the SAE J1772 connector, allowing the use of simple pass-through adapters.

== Adoption ==
=== Automakers ===
In May 2023, the Ford Motor Company became the first major automaker to announce that it would use NACS with its electric vehicles. Over the next two years, nearly every automaker selling vehicles in the North American market pledged to switch to NACS.

Initially, owners of cars with CCS1 will be offered a NACS adapter to enable charging at Tesla's network. Then, starting in 2025, the manufacturers will begin building NACS ports into new cars. In February, Ford became the first automaker to offer an adapter to customers, allowing Ford vehicles to charge with the adapter on a majority of Tesla's V3 and V4 chargers.

The automakers that committed to this transition are:

NACS adoption timeline
Company	Announced	Supercharger access	Ref.
Ford	May 25, 2023	February 29, 2024	
General Motors	June 8, 2023	September 18, 2024	
Rivian	June 21, 2023	March 18, 2024	
Volvo	June 27, 2023	October 29, 2024	
Polestar	June 29, 2023	October 29, 2024	
Mercedes-Benz	July 7, 2023	February 4, 2025	
Nissan	July 19, 2023	December 10, 2024	
Honda	August 18, 2023	July 22, 2025	
Jaguar Land Rover	September 21, 2023	August 8, 2025	
Hyundai/Genesis	October 5, 2023	March 25, 2025	
Kia	October 5, 2023	April 24, 2025	
BMW Group	October 17, 2023	December 10, 2025	
Toyota	October 19, 2023	October 22, 2025	
Subaru	November 1, 2023	October 22, 2025	
Lucid	November 6, 2023	January 31, 2025 (Note: For Lucid Gravity. Access for Lucid Air enabled on July 31, 2025.)	
Volkswagen Group	December 19, 2023	November 18, 2025	
Mazda	January 16, 2024	Planned	
Stellantis	February 2, 2024	March 19, 2026	
Mitsubishi	July 28, 2026	Planned	

=== Charging networks ===
Prior to the NACS being made an open standard in late 2022, several electric vehicle charging network operators had added Tesla charging connector adapters to legacy CHAdeMO-standard charging stations. These included the ONroute rest stop network in Ontario, Canada, where a Tesla adaptor was permanently attached to a CHAdeMO cord, and REVEL opened a charging station in Brooklyn, New York for a while after they were denied a license to operate a Tesla ride-hailing fleet in New York City. Ivy Charge in Ontario, Canada, announced plans to include CCS1-to-Tesla adaptors for some of their stations. Also EVgo, who added optional Tesla adaptors to CHAdeMO cords. In June 2023, EVgo announced it will add NACS connector support to more of its chargers.

In June 2023 several other EV charging station providers also announced plans to add NACS connector support to their chargers. These include FLO, a Quebec-based EV charging station company with over 90,000 chargers. EV fast-charger company FreeWire Technologies also announced plans to equip its battery-integrated Boost Chargers with NACS plugs by mid-2024. BC Hydro, Blink Charging, ChargePoint, Electrify America, and EVgo have also announced plans to add NACS connectors to their charging networks. In September 2023, hotel chain Hilton Worldwide announced an agreement with Tesla to install chargers with 20,000 NACS connectors across 2,000 of its properties in North America by 2025.

=== Equipment manufacturers ===
Several equipment manufacturers have announced that they plan to add NACS connectors to their products. As of June 2023 the list includes ABB, BTC Power, Tritium and Wallbox. Available charging cables for NACS have been specified at a maximum of 375 A (uncooled) and 650 A (liquid cooled).

== Competing standards ==
NACS vs. CCS1 connector

NACS

CCS1

Displayed approximately to scale

Several high-power DC charging standards are used for electric vehicles, each with varying levels of adoption globally. These include:

- Combined Charging System Type 1 (CCS1): This standard is commonly used for DC fast charging in North America and South Korea, particularly at non-Tesla charging stations. Tesla offers a CCS1 to NACS adapter for purchase. Some Tesla Supercharger stations are equipped with a "magic dock," which holds a NACS to CCS1 adapter.
- Combined Charging System Type 2 (CCS2): The legally mandated DC fast-charging standard for Europe and Oceania. Tesla vehicles sold in these regions since May 2019, as well as newer Superchargers, use CCS2. Older Tesla vehicles can be retrofitted to use CCS2 with an adapter.
- CHAdeMO: Used for DC fast-charging in Japan and equipped on some vehicles in North America and Europe. Tesla vehicles sold in Japan are equipped with NACS. Tesla offers a CHAdeMO to NACS adapter for purchase.
- GB/T: Legally mandated DC fast-charging standard in China. Tesla vehicles sold in China use GB/T.

As of November 2021, Tesla's Supercharger network was the largest DC fast-charging network in the US. However, other BEV competitors in the USA were previously unable to take advantage of the Supercharger network before the release of the "Magic Dock". Tesla cars, on the other hand, come with a SAE J1772 adapter – which allowed Tesla owners to take advantage of the large number of slower Level 2 AC charging stations that are fitted with J1772 plugs.

== Criticism ==
Tesla's decision to name its connector the "North American Charging Standard" was criticized by the Charging Interface Initiative (CharIN), the association responsible for the competing Combined Charging System (CCS), as the connector had not yet been published or recognized by a standards development organization. CharIN argued that the process of creating a standard should be collaborative, allowing input from all interested parties. Although CharIN initially criticized Tesla’s development process, it later acknowledged that while the NACS connector does not use the CCS physical connector standard, it does employ the same communication protocols developed for CCS.

== Gallery ==
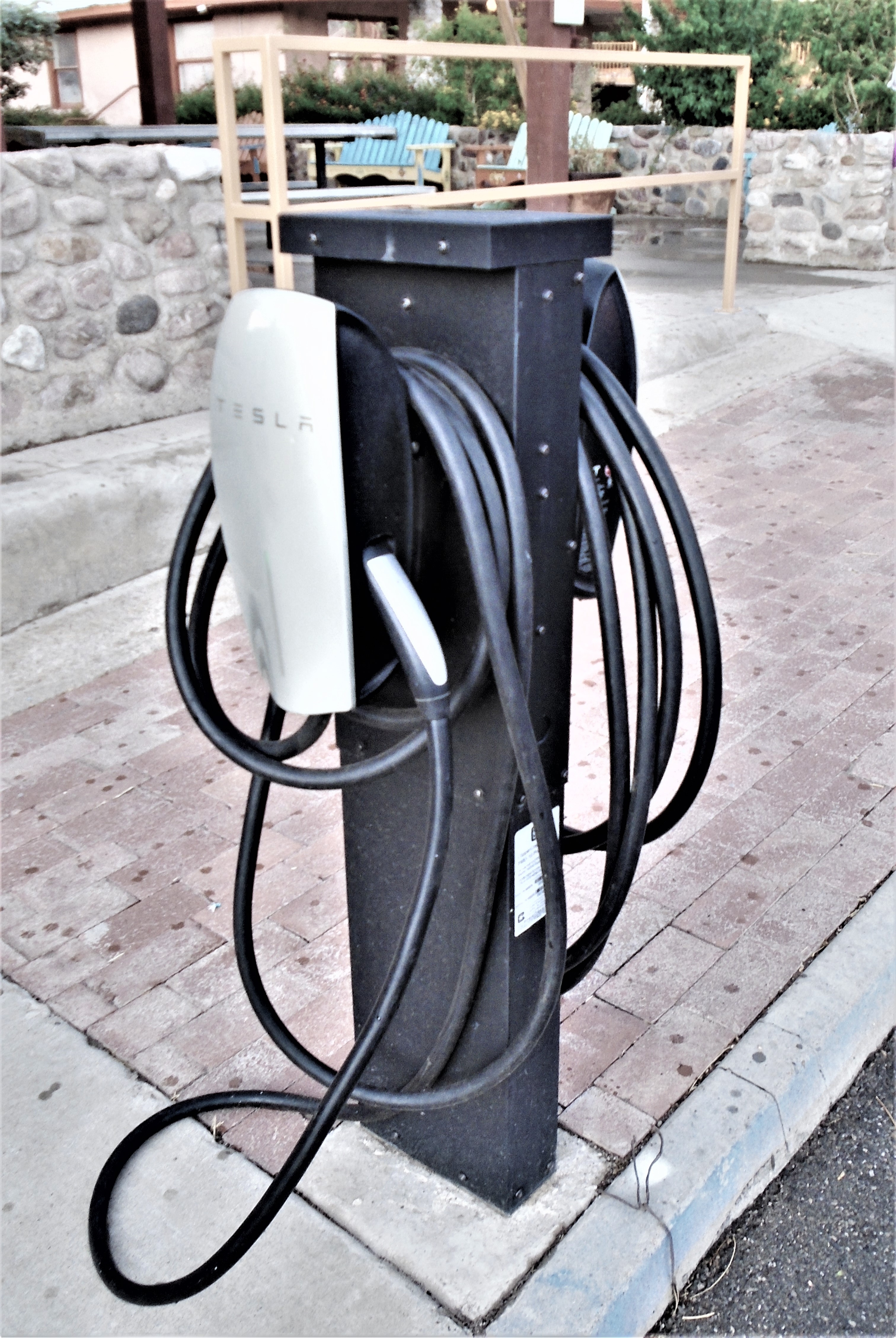
A public NACS-compatible AC charging station

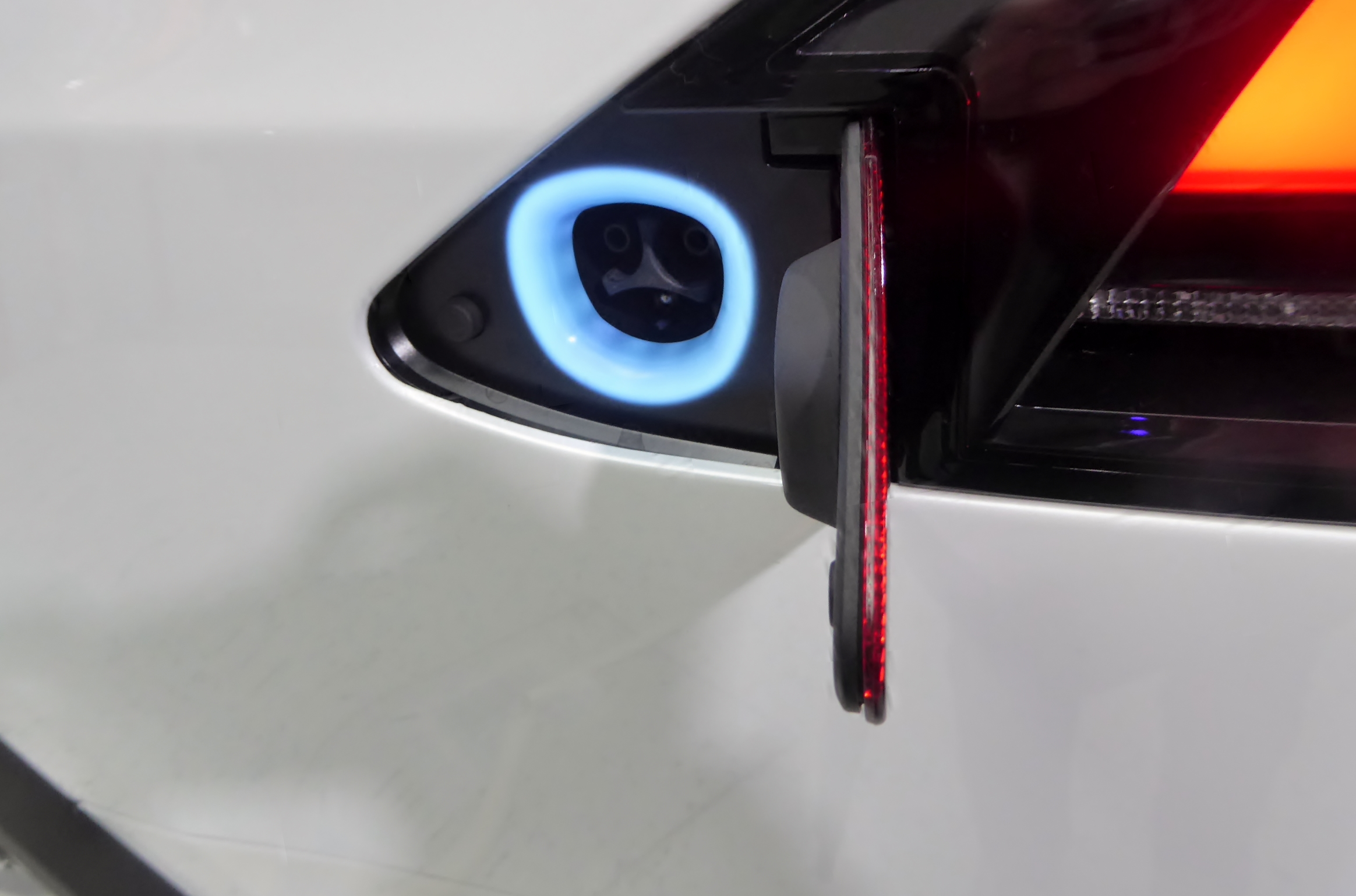
A Tesla Model X P90D equipped with a Tesla charging inlet, of the same style as NACS

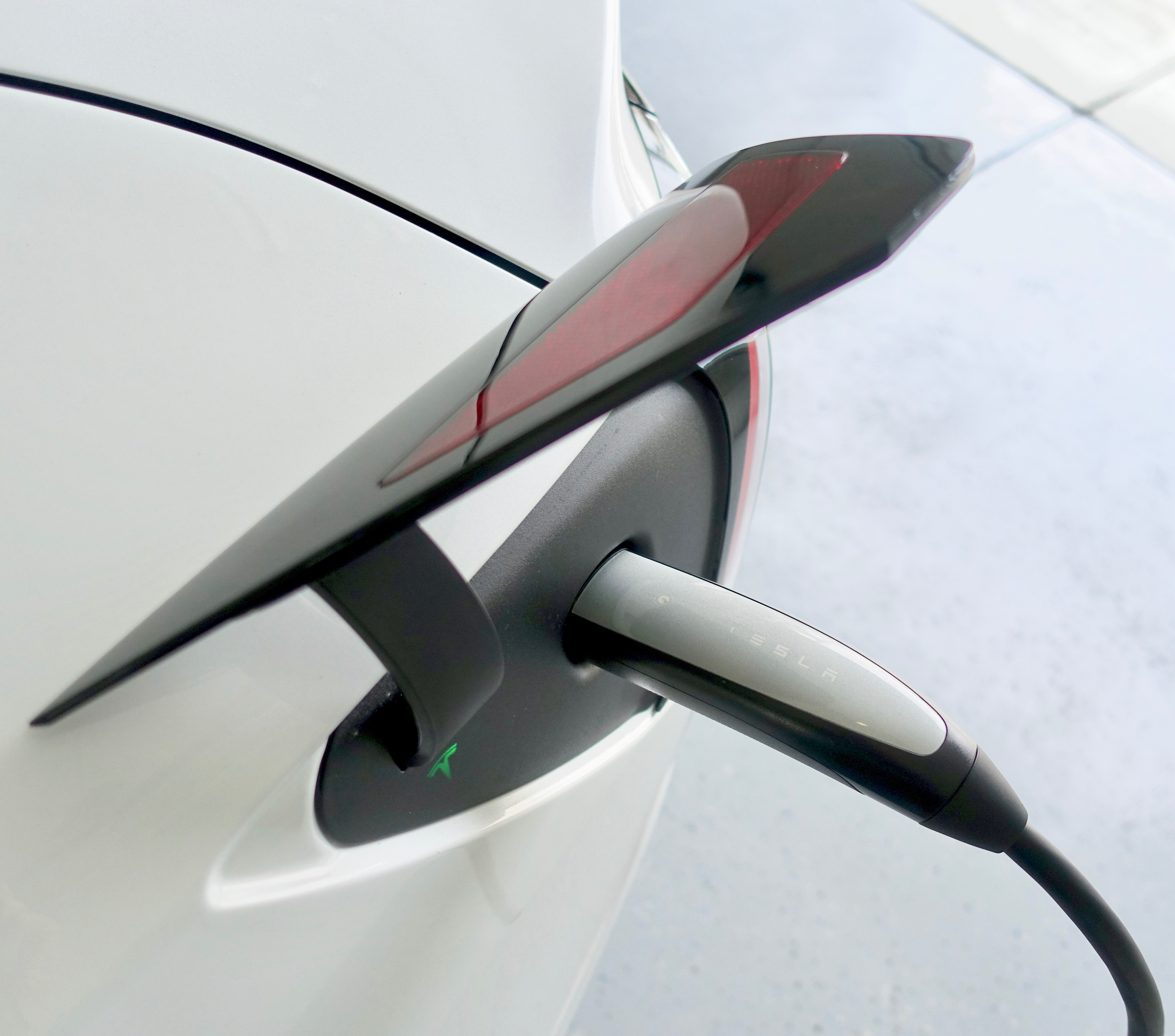
NACS-style charging cable

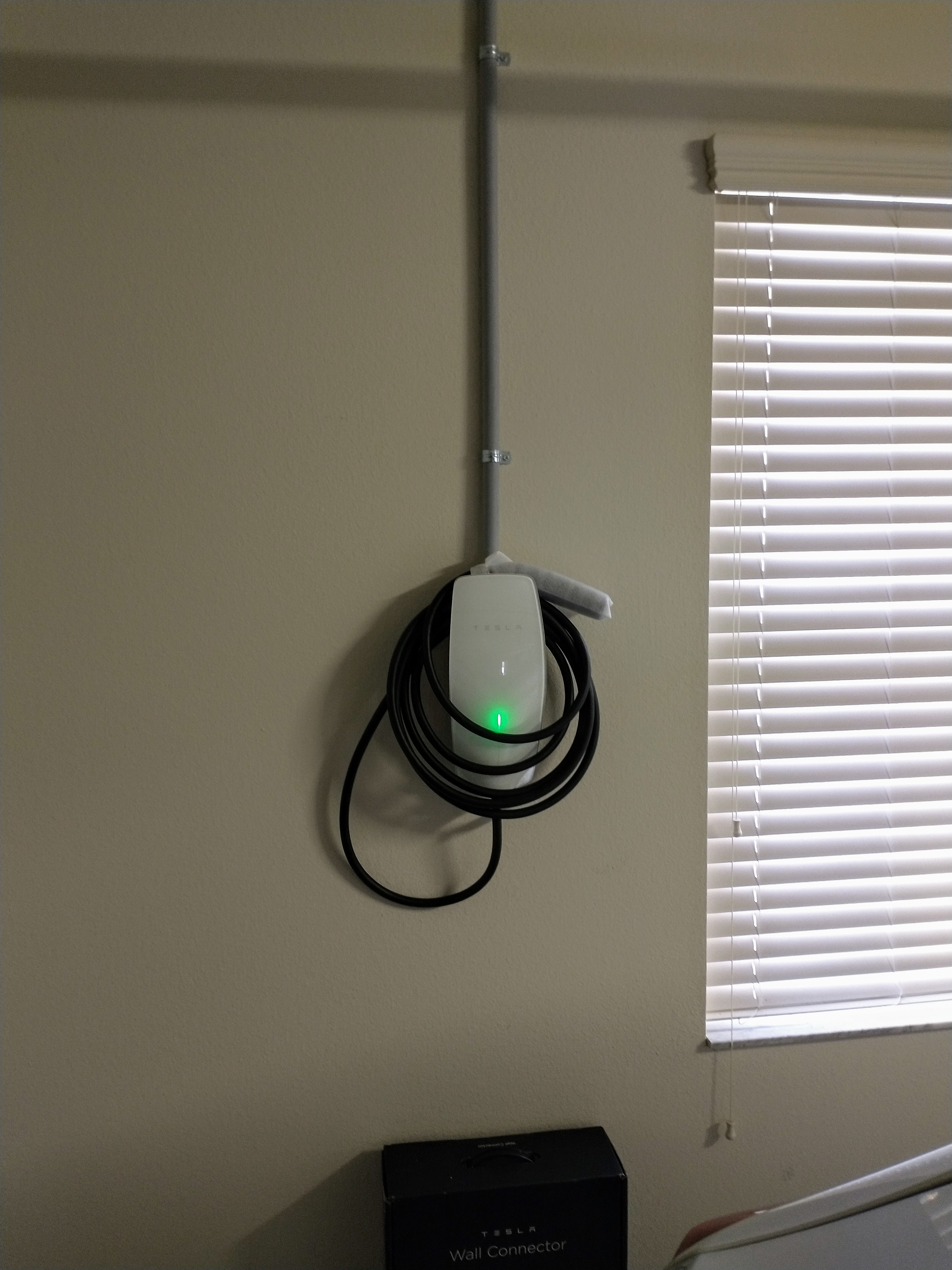
A newly installed NACS-compatible AC High Powered Wall Connector
