= CHAdeMO =

Fast charging method trade name

CHAdeMO Association

- Charging station plug
- Formation: 2010; 16 years ago
- Type: Nonprofit
- Purpose: Development of electric vehicle charging technology
- Website: chademo.com

CHAdeMO is a fast-charging system for battery electric vehicles, developed in 2010 by the CHAdeMO Association, formed by the Tokyo Electric Power Company and five major Japanese automakers. The name is an abbreviation of "CHArge de MOve" (which the organization translates as "charge for moving") and is derived from the Japanese phrase "o CHA deMO ikaga desuka" (お茶でもいかがですか), translating to English as "How about a cup of tea?", referring to the time it would take to charge a car.

It competes with the Combined Charging System (CCS), which since 2014 has been required on public charging infrastructure installed in the European Union, Tesla's North American Charging System (NACS) used by its Supercharger network outside of Europe, and China's GB/T charging standard.

As of 2025, CHAdeMO remains popular in Japan but is equipped on few vehicles sold in North America or Europe. The Nissan Leaf was the last fully electric car available in North America with CHAdeMO, with Nissan adopting NACS for the 2026 model year. The Mitsubishi Outlander PHEV is the only vehicle in North America equipped with CHAdeMO.

First-generation CHAdeMO connectors deliver up to 62.5 kW by 500 V, 125 A direct current through a proprietary electrical connector, adding about 120 kilometres (75 mi) of range in half an hour. It has been included in several international vehicle charging standards.

The second-generation specification allows for up to 400 kW by 1 kV, 400 A direct current. The CHAdeMO Association is currently co-developing with China Electricity Council (CEC) the third-generation standard with the working name of "ChaoJi" that aims to deliver 900 kW.

== History ==
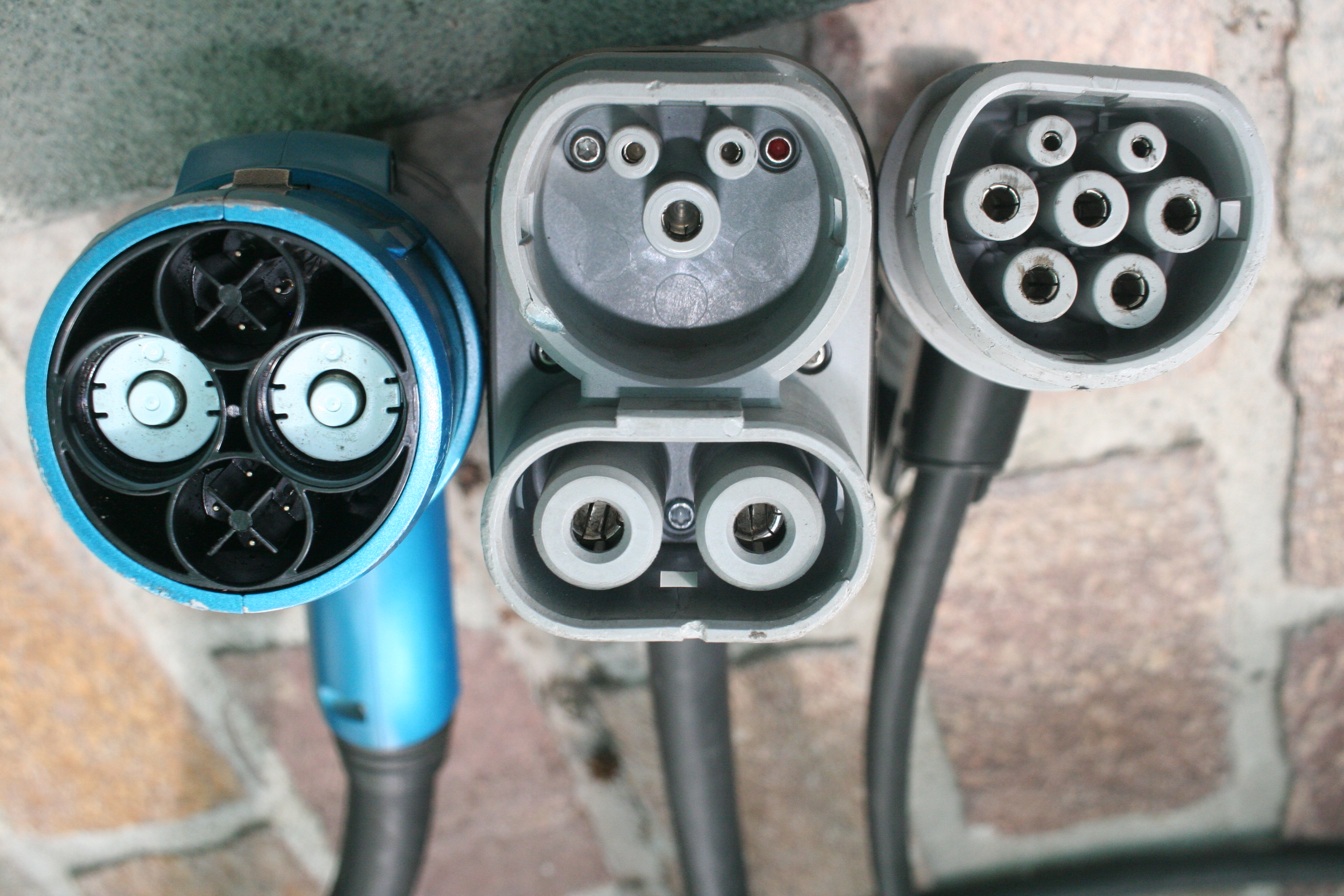
CHAdeMO connector (left), with the competing Combined Charging System (CCS) Combo 2 connector (middle), and the AC Type 2 connector (right)

CHAdeMO originated out of a charging system design from the Tokyo Electric Power Company (TEPCO). TEPCO had been participating on numerous EV infrastructure trial projects between 2006 and 2009 in collaboration with Nissan, Mitsubishi, Fuji Heavy Industries (now Subaru), and other manufacturers. These trials resulted in TEPCO developing patented technology and a specification, which would form the basis for the CHAdeMO.

The first commercial CHAdeMO charging infrastructure was commissioned in 2009 alongside the launch of the Mitsubishi i-MiEV.

In March 2010, TEPCO formed the CHAdeMO Association with Toyota, Nissan, Mitsubishi, and Subaru. They were later joined by Hitachi, Honda and Panasonic. CHAdeMO would be the first organization to propose a standardized DC fast charge system to be shared across diverse EVs, regardless of their brands and models.

CHAdeMO became a published international standard in 2014 when the International Electrotechnical Commission (IEC) adopted IEC 61851-23 for the charging system, IEC 61851-24 for communication, and IEC 62196-3 configuration AA for the connector. Later that year, the European Committee for Electrotechnical Standardization (EN) added CHAdeMO as a published standard along with CCS Combo 2, followed by the Institute of Electrical and Electronics Engineers (IEEE) in 2016.

A major blow to the international adoption of CHAdeMO came in 2013 when European Commission designated the Combined Charging System (CCS) Combo 2 as the mandated plug for DC high-power charging infrastructure in Europe. While the European Parliament had contemplated transitioning out CHAdeMO infrastructure by January 2019, the final mandate only required that all publicly accessible chargers in the EU be equipped 'at least' with CCS Combo 2, allowing stations to offer multiple connector types.

While CHAdeMO was the first fast-charging standard to see widespread deployment and remains widely equipped on vehicles sold in Japan, it has been losing market share in other countries. Honda was the first of the CHAdeMO Association members to stop equipping the connector on vehicles sold outside of Japan starting with the Clarity Electric in 2016. Nissan decided not to use CHAdeMO on its Ariya SUVs introduced in 2021 outside of Japan. Toyota and Subaru have also equipped their jointly developed bZ4X/Solterra with CCS connectors outside of Japan. As of October 2026, the Mitsubishi Outlander PHEV is the only plug-in vehicle equipped with CHAdeMO for sale in North America.

As demand increased for EV charging services for Tesla vehicles after 2019, and prior to opening of the competing North American Charging System (NACS) in late 2022, several electric vehicle charging network operators had added some Tesla charging connector adapters to CHAdeMO-standard charging stations. These included, ONroute rest stop network in Ontario, Canada—where a Tesla adaptor was permanently attached to a CHAdeMO connector on some 60 charge stations— and REVEL opened a charging station in Brooklyn for a while after they were denied a license to operate a Tesla ride-hailing fleet in New York City. Also, EVgo, added a few optional Tesla adaptors to CHAdeMO connectors as early as 2019.

== Connector design ==
CHAdeMO

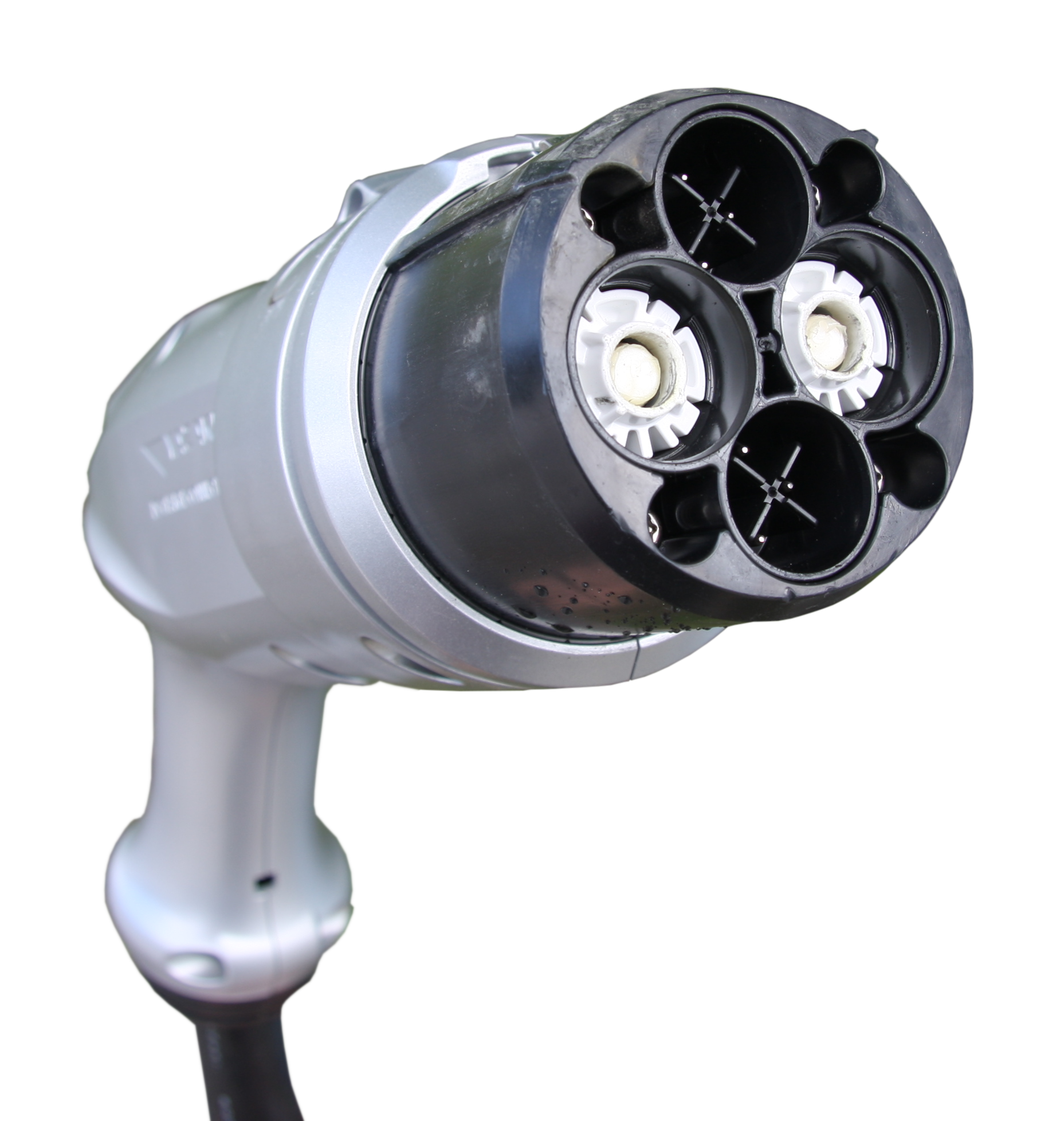
- CHAdeMO electric vehicle connector
- Type: Automotive power connector

Production history
- Produced: Since 2009

General specifications
- Diameter: 70 millimetres (2.8 in)
- Pins: 10 (1 reserved)

Electrical
- Signal: high-voltage DC

Pinout
- Pinouts for CHAdeMO, looking at end of vehicle connector
FG	Ground	reference for control lines
SS1 / SS2	Charge sequence signal	start/stop charging
N/C	(not connected)	
DCP	Charging enable	vehicle grants EVSE permission to connect power
DC+ / DC-	DC power	supplied power
PP	Connector proximity detection	charge interlock, disables drivetrain while connected
C-H / C-L	CAN bus	communication with vehicle bus to establish operational parameters

=== DC fast charge ===
Most electric vehicles (EV) have an on-board charger that uses a full bridge rectifier to transform alternating current (AC) from the electrical grid to direct current (DC) suitable for recharging the EV's battery pack. Most EVs are designed with limited AC input power, typically based on the available power of consumer outlets: for example, 240 V, 30 A in the United States and Japan; 240 V, 40 A in Canada; and 230 V, 15 A or 3φ, 400 V, 32 A in Europe and Australia. AC chargers with higher limits have been specified, for example SAE J1772-2009 has an option for 240 V, 80 A and VDE-AR-E 2623-2-2 has a 3φ, 400 V, 63 A. But these charger types have been rarely deployed.

Cost and thermal issues limit how much power the rectifier can handle, so beyond approximately 240 V AC and 75 A it is better for an external charging station to deliver DC directly to the battery. For faster charging, dedicated DC chargers can be built in permanent locations and provided with high-current connections to the grid. Such high voltage and high-current charging is called a DC fast charge (DCFC) or DC quick charging (DCQC).

=== Connector protocols and history ===
While the notion of shared off-board DC charging infrastructure, together with the charging system design for CHAdeMO came out of TEPCOs trials starting in 2006, the connector itself had been designed in 1993, and was specified by the 1993 Japan Electric Vehicle Standard (JEVS) G105-1993 from the JARI.

In addition to carrying power, the connector also makes a data connection using the CAN bus protocol. This performs functions such as a safety interlock to avoid energizing the connector before it is safe (similar to SAE J1772), transmitting battery parameters to the charging station including when to stop charging (top battery percentage, usually 80%), target voltage, total battery capacity, and how the station should vary its output current while charging.

The first protocol issued was CHAdeMO 0.9, which offered maximum charging power of 62.5 kW (125 A × 500 V DC). Version 1.0 followed in 2012, enhancing vehicle protection, compatibility, and reliability. Version 1.1 (2015) allowed the current to dynamically change during charging; Version 1.2 (2017) increased maximum power to 200 kW (400 A × 500 V DC).

CHAdeMO published its protocol for 400 kW (400 A × 1 kV) 'ultra-fast' charging in May 2018 as CHAdeMO 2.0. CHAdeMO 2.0 allowed the standard to better compete with the CCS 'ultra-fast' stations being built around the world as part of new networks such as IONITY charging consortium.

=== Vehicle-to-grid (V2G) ===
In 2014, CHAdeMO published its protocol for vehicle-to-grid (V2G) integration, which also includes applications for vehicle to load (V2L) or vehicle to home-off grid (V2H), collectively denoted V2X. The technology enables EV owners to use the car as an energy storage device, potentially lowering costs by optimising energy usage for the current time of use pricing and providing electricity to the grid. Since 2012, multiple V2X demo projects using the CHAdeMO protocol have been demonstrated worldwide. Some of the recent projects include UCSD INVENT in the United States, as well as Sciurus and e4Future in the United Kingdom that are supported by Innovate UK.

=== CHAdeMO 3.0: ChaoJi ===
The ChaoJi connector, also referenced as CHAdeMO 3.0, is a high-power charging standard for electric cars, released in 2020. The connector has a lemniscate shape (∞), with a flat bottom edge and is planned for charging battery electric vehicles at up to 900 kilowatts using direct current. The design incorporates backward compatibility with CHAdeMO (used globally) and the GB/T DC-charging (used mainly in mainland China), using a dedicated inlet adapter for each system. The circuit interface of ChaoJi is also designed to be fully compatible with the Combined Charging System, also known as CCS (used mainly in Europe and North America).

A joint agreement between the CHAdeMO association and the China Electricity Council (with State Grid Corporation of China) was signed on 28 August 2018 after which the development was enlarged to a larger international community of experts.

=== Charge2Bike ===
A CHAdeMO standard for Electrically Power Assisted Cycle (EPAC) Electric bicycles charger (Charge2Bike v1.2) was released in late 2024. OEM like Bosch, Shimano, Yamaha and Panasonic are involved.

The standard allows (fast) charging of the battery with direct current without the need to bring along the specific charger that connects to the AC grid. It provides up to 60 Volt DC, the Extra-low voltage deemed safe, and up to 20 A (max. 800 W).

Similar standards already exist: the common USB-C is limited to 240 Watt (48 Volt, 5 Amp), while EnergyBus (48V, 30A, 1200W) already offers public chargers in parts of Europe, at higher power.

== Deployment ==
CHAdeMO-type fast charging stations were initially installed in great numbers by TEPCO in Japan, which required the creation of an additional power distribution network to supply these stations.

Since then, CHAdeMO charger installation has expanded its geographical reach and in May 2023, the CHAdeMO Association stated that there were 57,800 CHAdeMO chargers installed in 99 countries. These included 9,600 charging stations in Japan, 31,600 in Europe, 9,400 in North America, and 7,000 elsewhere.

As of January 2022, a total of 260 certified CHAdeMO charger models have been produced by 50 companies.

== Gallery ==
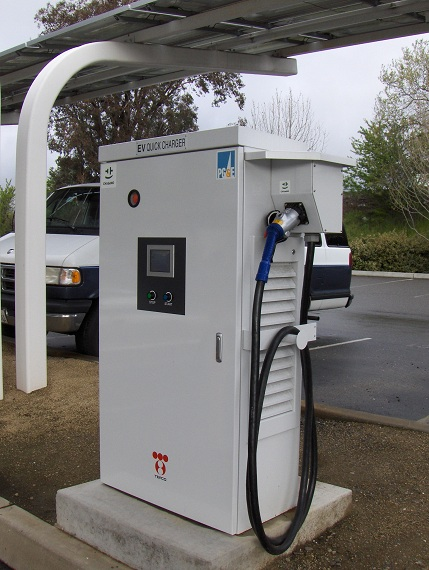
A TEPCO branded charger in Vacaville, California, United States

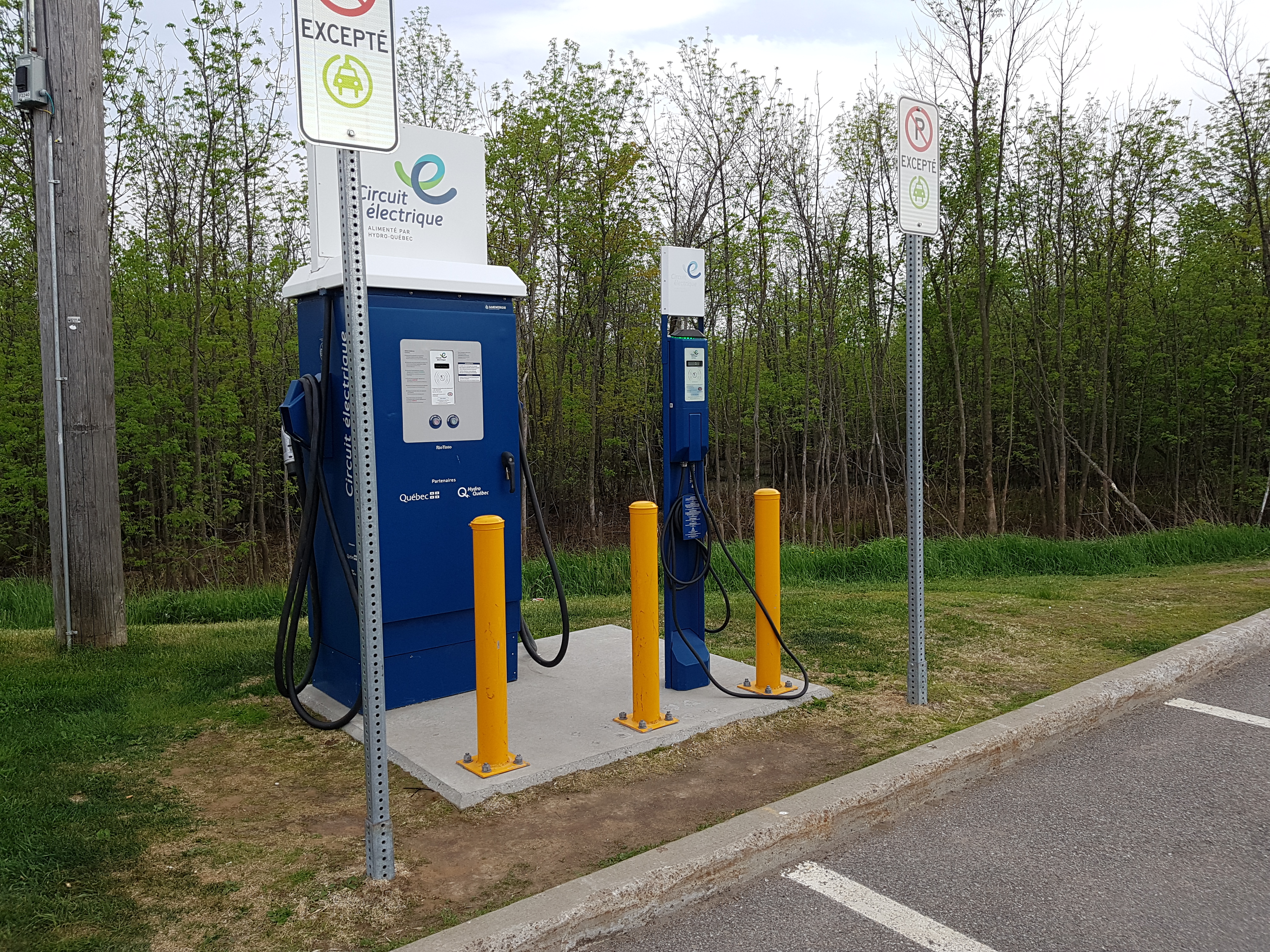
A charging site in Quebec, Canada with a 50 kW CHAdeMO / CCS "combo" DC fast charger and a Level 2 AC connector.

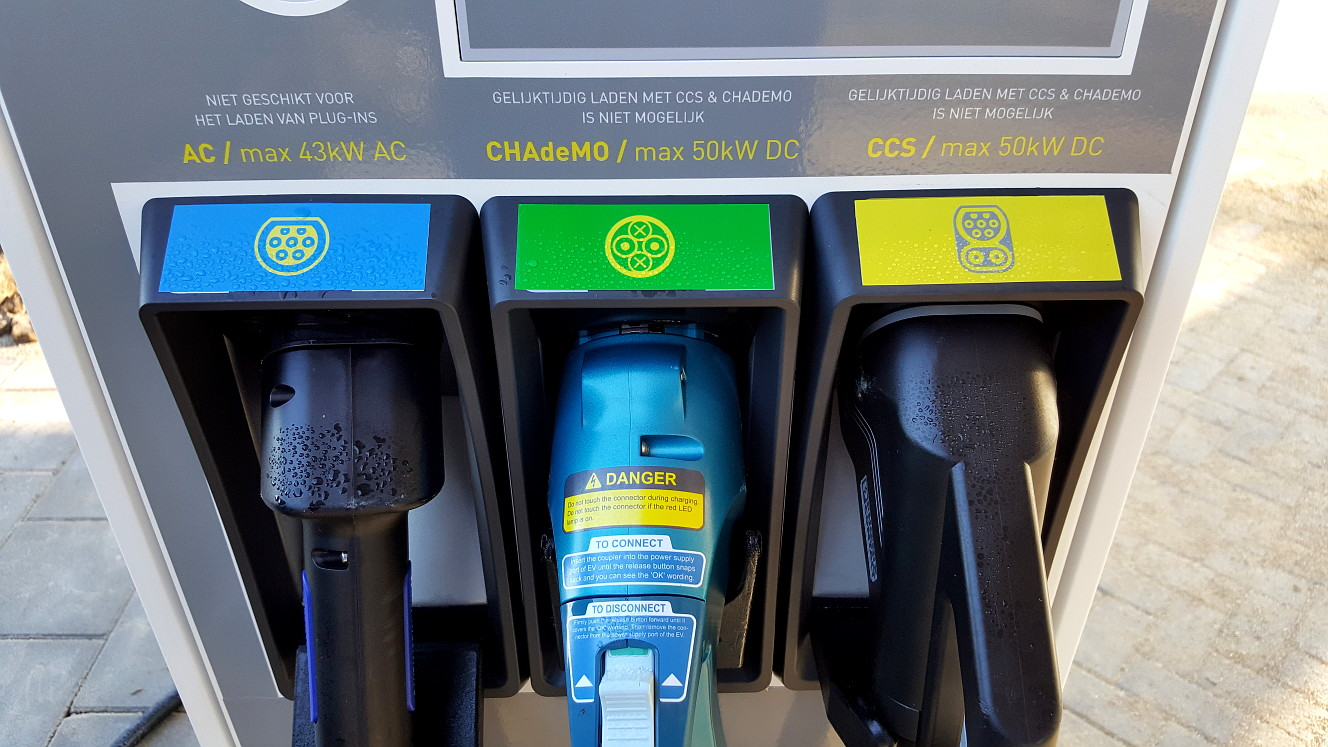
A "combo" fast charger station with Type 2, CHAdeMO, and CCS connectors

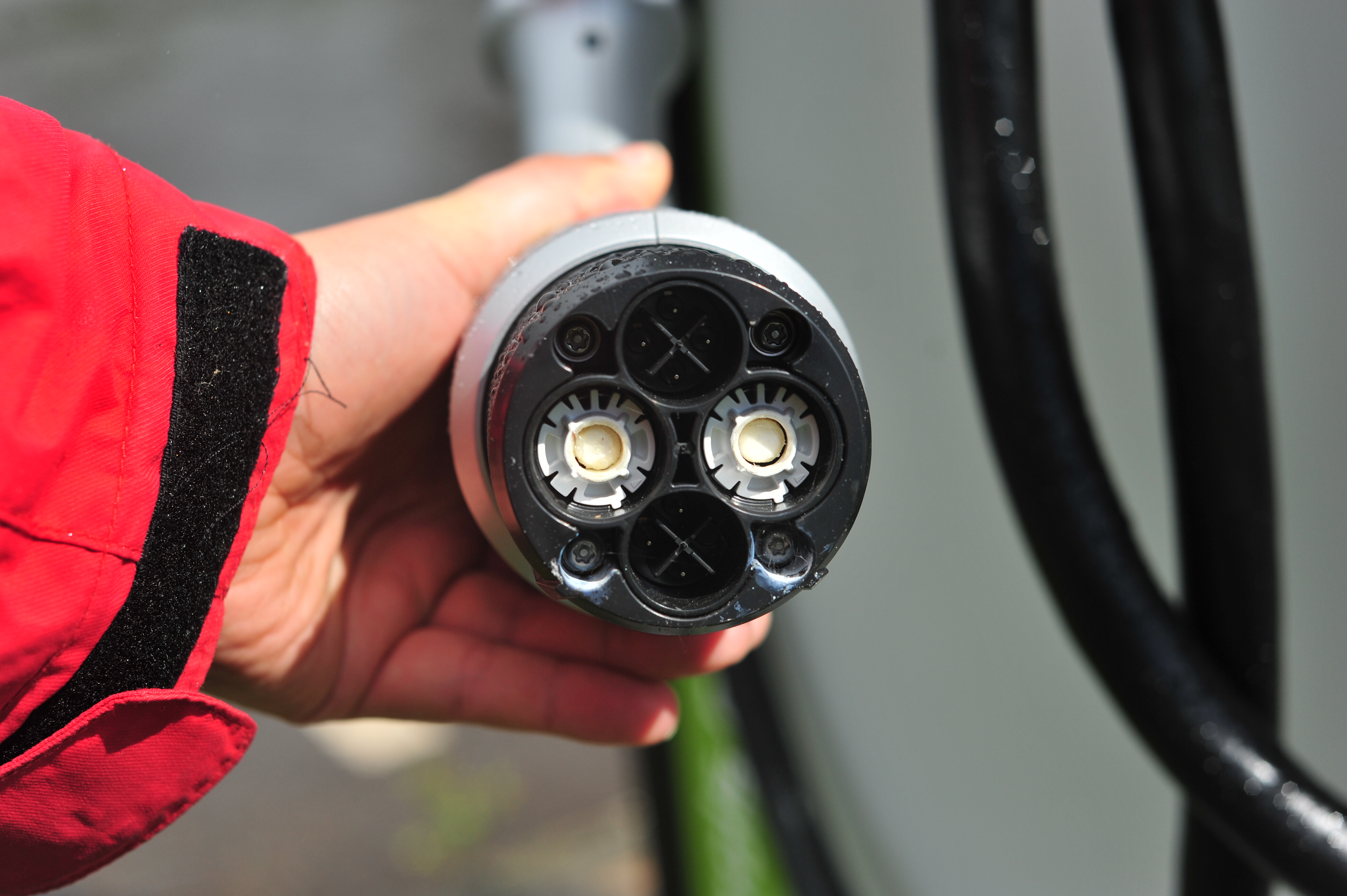
CHAdeMO plug

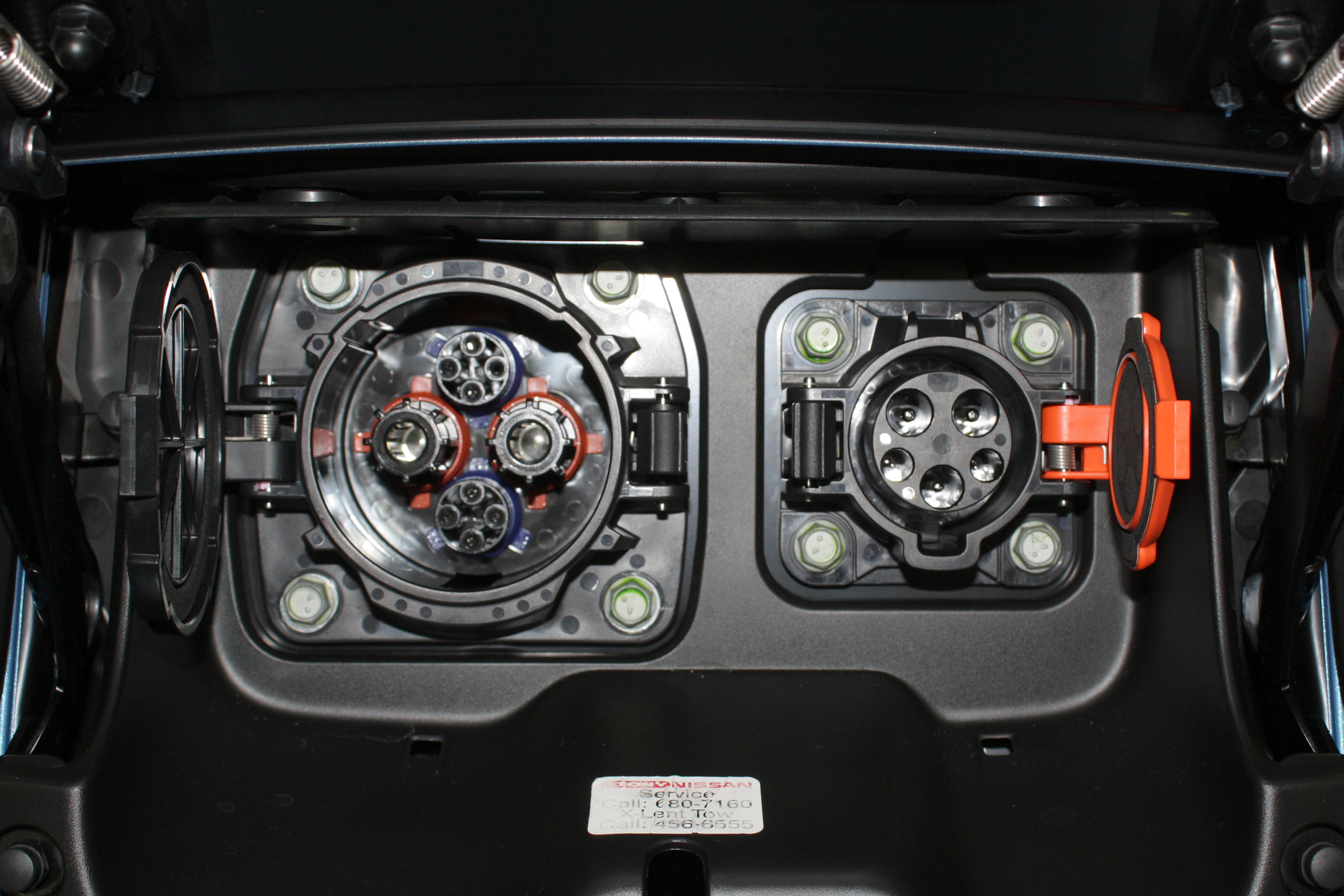
CHAdeMO charging inlet (left) on a Nissan Leaf. An SAE J1772 inlet is also shown on the right.

== See also ==
- CCS Combo
- SAE J1772 (Type 1)
- ChaoJi
- GB/T charging standard
