= National Standards of China =

GB Logo

The National Standards of the People's Republic of China (Chinese: 中华人民共和国国家标准; pinyin: Zhōnghuá rénmín gònghéguó guójiā biāozhǔn), coded as GB (Chinese: 国标; pinyin: guóbiāo; lit. 'national standards'), are the standards issued by the Standardization Administration of China under the authorization of Article 10 of the Standardization Law of the People's Republic of China.

According to Article 2 of the Standardization Law, national standards are divided into mandatory national standards and recommended national standards. Mandatory national standards are prefixed "GB". Recommended national standards are prefixed "GB/T". Guidance technical documents are prefixed with "GB/Z", but are not legally part of the national standard system.

Mandatory national standards are the basis for the product testing which products must undergo during the China Compulsory Certificate (CCC or 3C) certification, commonly referred to as 三C认证. If there is no corresponding mandatory national standard, CCC is not required.

== Nomenclature ==
A Chinese standard code has three parts: the prefix, the sequential number, and the year number. For example, GB 2312-1980 refers to the national compulsory standard (GB), sequential number 2312, revision year 1980.

Besides the national standard repository, China allows the registration of standards by industry/trade, by localities (DB, Dìfāng Biāozhǔn, "local standard"), by associations (T), or by an individual company (Q). The overall prefix number-year format is retained.

== Copyright and availability ==
Under the first clause of Article 5 of the Copyright Law of the People's Republic of China, compulsory standards are not copyrightable as they fall under "other documents of a legislative, administrative or judicial nature". In 1999, the Supreme People's Court ruled that although compulsory standards do not enjoy copyright protections, publishing houses can be given exclusive, sui generis rights to publish a compulsory standard.

The Standardization Administration operates a website for obtaining digital copies of the standards (excluding those dealing with food safety, environment protection, and civil engineering). The availability is broken down as follows (as of October 2023):

- Out of 2029 included GB standards, 1464 may be read online or downloaded as a PDF file. The remaining 565 Cǎibiāo (采标, adopted international standards) may only be read online.
- Out of 41664 included GB/T standards, 27154 may be read online. The remaining 4513 Cǎibiāo are only indexed by title.
- Out of 573 included GB/Z documents, 261 may be read online. The remaining 312 Cǎibiāo are only indexed by title.

Copies of standards (written in simplified Chinese) may be obtained from the SPC web store.

== List ==
A non-exhaustive list of National Standards of the People's Republic of China is listed as follows, accompanied with similar international standards of ISO, marked as identical (IDT), equivalent (EQV), or non-equivalent (NEQ).

Mandatory standards
| Number | Equivalent to | Title |
|---|---|---|
| GB 2099.1‐2008 | | AC power mains plugs and sockets |
| GB 1002‐2008 | | Safety Technical Code for Infants and Children Textile Products |
| GB 2312-1980 | | Code of Chinese graphic character set for information interchange, primary set; see also GBK, a common extension of GB 2312 |
| GB 3100-1993 | EQV ISO 1000:1992 | SI units and recommendations for the use of their multiples and of certain other units |
| GB 3101-1993 | EQV ISO 31-0:1992 | General principles concerning quantities, units and symbols |
| GB 3259-1992 | | Transliterating rules of Chinese phonetic alphabet on titles for books and periodicals in Chinese |
| GB 3304-1991 | | Names of nationalities of China in romanization with codes |
| GB 5768-2009 | | Road traffic signs and markings |
| GB 6513-1986 | | Character set for bibliographic information interchange on mathematical coding of characters |
| GB 7714-1987 | | Descriptive rules for bibliographic references |
| GB 8045-1987 | | Mongolian 7-bit and 8-bit coded graphic character sets for information processing interchange |
| GB 12050-1989 | | Information processing – Uighur coded graphic character sets for information interchange |
| GB 12052-1989 | | Korean character coded character sets for information interchange |
| GB 12200.1-1990 | | Chinese information processing – Vocabulary – Part 1: Fundamental terms |
| GB 13000-2010 | IDT ISO/IEC 10646:2003 | Information technology – Universal multiple-octet coded character set (UCS) |
| GB 14887-2003 | | Road traffic signals |
| GB 18030-2005 | | Information technology – Chinese ideograms coded character set for information interchange – Extension for the basic set |
| GB 31701-2015 | | Safety Technical Code for Infants and Children Textile Products |
| GB 47372-2026 | | Technical Specifications for the Safety of Mobile Power Supplies |
| GB 500011-2001 | | Civil engineering – Code for seismic design of buildings |
| GB 50223-2008 | | Civil engineering – Standard for classification of seismic protection of building constructions |
Recommended standards
| Number | Equivalent to | Title |
| GB/T 148-1997 | NEQ ISO 216:1975 | Writing paper and certain classes of printed matter – Trimmed sizes-A and B series |
| GB/T 1988-1998 | EQV ISO/IEC 646:1991 | Information technology – 7-bit coded character set for information interchange |
| GB/T 2311-2000 | IDT ISO/IEC 2022:1994 | Information technology – Character code structure and extension techniques |
| GB/T 2260-2007 | | Codes for the administrative divisions of the People's Republic of China |
| GB/T 2261-1980 | None but similar to ISO 5218 | Codes for sexual distinction of human beings |
| GB/T 2659-2000 | EQV ISO 3166-1:1997 | Codes for the representation of names of countries and regions |
| GB/T 4880-1991 | EQV ISO 639:1988 | Codes for the representation of names of languages |
| GB/T 4880.2-2000 | EQV ISO 639-2:1998 | Codes for the representation of names of languages – Part 2: Alpha-3 code |
| GB/T 4881-1985 | | Code of Chinese languages |
| GB/T 5795-2002 | EQV ISO 2108:1992 | China standard book numbering |
| GB/T 7408-1994 | EQV ISO 8601:1988 | Data elements and interchange formats – Information interchange – Representation of dates and times |
| GB/T 7589-1987 | | Code of Chinese ideogram set for information interchange – 2nd supplementary set |
| GB/T 7590-1987 | | Code of Chinese ideogram set for information interchange – 4th supplementary set |
| GB/T 12200.2-1994 | | Chinese information processing – Vocabulary – Part 2: Chinese and Chinese character |
| GB/T 12345-1990 | | Code of Chinese graphic character set for information interchange, supplementary set |
| GB/T 12406-1996 | IDT ISO 4217:1990 | Codes for the representation of currencies and funds |
| GB/T 13131-1991 | | Code of Chinese ideogram set for information interchange – The 3rd supplementary set |
| GB/T 13132-1991 | | Code of Chinese ideogram set for information interchange – The 5th supplementary set |
| GB/T 13134-1991 | | Yi coded character set for information interchange |
| GB/T 15273 | IDT ISO/IEC 8859 | Information processing – 8-bit single-byte coded graphic character sets |
| GB/T 15834-2011 | | Use of punctuation marks |
| GB/T 15835-1995 | | General rules for writing numerals in publications |
| GB/T 16159-2012 | | Basic rules for Hanyu Pinyin Orthography |
| GB/T 16831-1997 | IDT ISO 6709:1983 | Standard representation of latitude, longitude and altitude for geographic point locations |
| GB/T 17742-1999 | | China seismic intensity scale, or liedu |
| GB/T 18487-2015 | EQV IEC 61851 | Conducting charging systems for electric vehicles: 18487.1 – General requirements; 18487.2 – Electromagnetic compatibility requirements for off-board electric vehicle supply equipment; 18487.3 – Electromagnetic compatibility requirements for on-board electric vehicle supply equipment |
| GB/T 19000-2000 | IDT ISO 9000:2000 | Quality management systems – Fundamentals and vocabulary |
| GB/T 20234-2015 | EQV IEC 62196 & SAE J1772 | Connecting devices for conductive charging of electric vehicles: 20234.1 – General requirements; 20234.2 – AC charging interface (using Type 2 connector); 20234.3 – DC charging interface |
| GB/T 20542-2006 | | Tibetan Coded Character Set Extension A |
| GB/T 24001-1996 | IDT ISO 14001:1996 | Environmental management systems – Specification with guidance for use |
| GB/T 22238-2008 | | Tibetan Coded Character Set Extension B |
| GB/T 27930-2015 | EQV ISO 15118 & SAE J1772, based on SAE J1939 for CAN bus | Communication protocol between off-board conductive charger and battery management system for electric vehicles |
| GB/T 28039-2011 | | The Chinese phonetic alphabet spelling rules for Chinese names |
| GB/T 32960-2016 | | Technical Specification of Remote Service and Management System for Electric Vehicles |
| GB/T 33661-2017 | | Calculation and promulgation of the Chinese calendar |
| GB/T 37752 serie-2019 | EQV ISO 13577 serie | Industrial furnaces and associated processing equipment Parts 1 to 4 |
| GB/T 38146.1-2019 | | China automotive test cycle – Part 1: Light-duty vehicles |

Changes are made frequently within the Chinese regulatory system as new standards are released and existing standards are updated.

== See also ==
- GOST
- China Compulsory Certificate (CCC or 3C)
- China Food and Drug Administration
- Chinese National Standards, used in the Republic of China
- Vietnam Standards
- Other meanings of Guóbiāo:
  - Guójì Biāozhǔn Wǔ (国际标准舞, International Standard Dancesport)
  - Guóbiāo Májiàng (国标麻将, National Standard Mahjong)
