= ChaoJi =

Electric vehicle charging standard

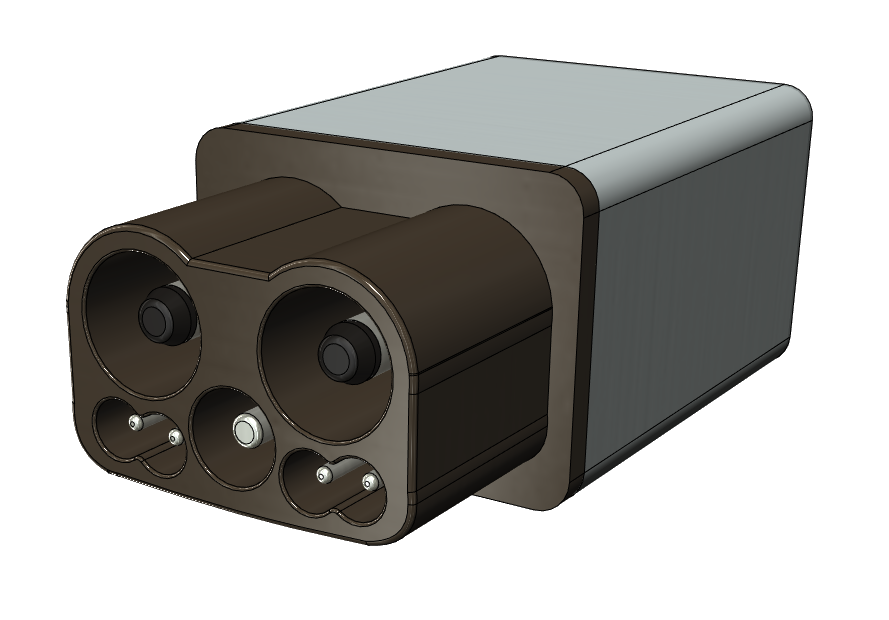
- Rendering of ChaoJi connector
- Type: Electric vehicle, motorcycle, construction machine, aircraft and ship charging

Production history
- Designer: CHAdeMO Association, China Electricity Council (CEC)
- Designed: 2018‒2020
- Produced: 2021‒

General specifications
- Pins: 7 (1 earth, 1 positive, 1 negative, 4 signalling for standard configuration)
- Connector: ChaoJi (hardware is harmonised); Ultra-ChaoJi (for megawatt charging)

Electrical
- Signal: DC
- Earth: Dedicated pin
- Max. voltage: 1500 V
- Max. current: 600 A

Pinout
- Pinouts for ChaoJi vehicle connector and vehicle inlet
DC+	Positive	power
DC-	Negative	power
PE	Protective earth	full-current protective earthing
CC1	Connection Confirmation 1	charger ⇄ car
CC2	Connection Confirmation 2	car ⇄ charger
S+	Signalling	CAN_H
S-	Signalling	CAN_L
- 2×10-millimetre-diameter (0.4 in) power transfer pins

The ChaoJi connector, also referenced as CHAdeMO 3.0, is a high-power charging standard for electric cars, released in 2020. The connector has a lemniscate shape (∞), with a flat bottom edge and is planned for charging battery electric vehicles at up to 900 kilowatts using direct current. The design incorporates backward compatibility with CHAdeMO (used globally) and the GB/T DC-charging (used mainly in mainland China), using a dedicated inlet adapter for each system. The circuit interface of ChaoJi is also designed to be fully compatible with the Combined Charging System, also known as CCS (used mainly in Europe and North America).

A joint agreement between the CHAdeMO association and the China Electricity Council (with State Grid Corporation of China) was signed on 28 August 2018 after which the development was enlarged to a larger international community of experts.

== Implementation ==
The new EVs implementing the standard are to be fitted with a female ChaoJi DC inlet, with a vehicle-side locking mechanism. This inlet can be co-sited in a "Combo" format underneath a GB/T-AC inlet (female), an SAE J1772 AC inlet (male), or 1‒3-phase AC Type 2 inlet (male).

For the charging infrastructure, DC fast-chargers would be fitted with the common ChaoJi male plug outlet and implement one or more variations of communication protocols:

1. ChaoJi-1 operating under the GB/T protocol, for primary deployment in mainland China.
2. ChaoJi-2 operating under the CHAdeMO 3.0 protocol, for primary deployment in Japan and other parts of the world.

Communication between the car and charger would use a CAN bus for both ChaoJi-1 and -2. A unified communication protocol based on Ethernet is also under consideration.

Power transfer pins are 10-millimetre-diameter (0.4 in) and attached to the infrastructure (male) side. The connector is designed to be at least as strong as a CHAdeMO outlet.

Updates to the ChaoJi standard enables compatibility with the CHAdeMO 3.1 protocol (and by extension CCS).

== Megawatt charging ==
A new coupler codenamed 'Ultra-ChaoJi' with an additional set of power pins above the standard ChaoJi pinouts, is currently under development. Ultra-ChaoJi is expected to be used by electrified heavy-duty vehicles (HDVs), airplanes and ships in the near future.

== Etymology ==
The name comes from pinyin: chāojí, meaning "super". The reason for choosing such a name was multifactorial. Other than the reference to supercharging, the word ChaoJi itself sounds similar to "charger" and, like CHAdeMO, starts with "Cha".
