= Blink Charging =

Electric Vehicle Charging Company

Blink Charging Co.
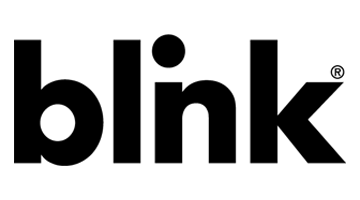

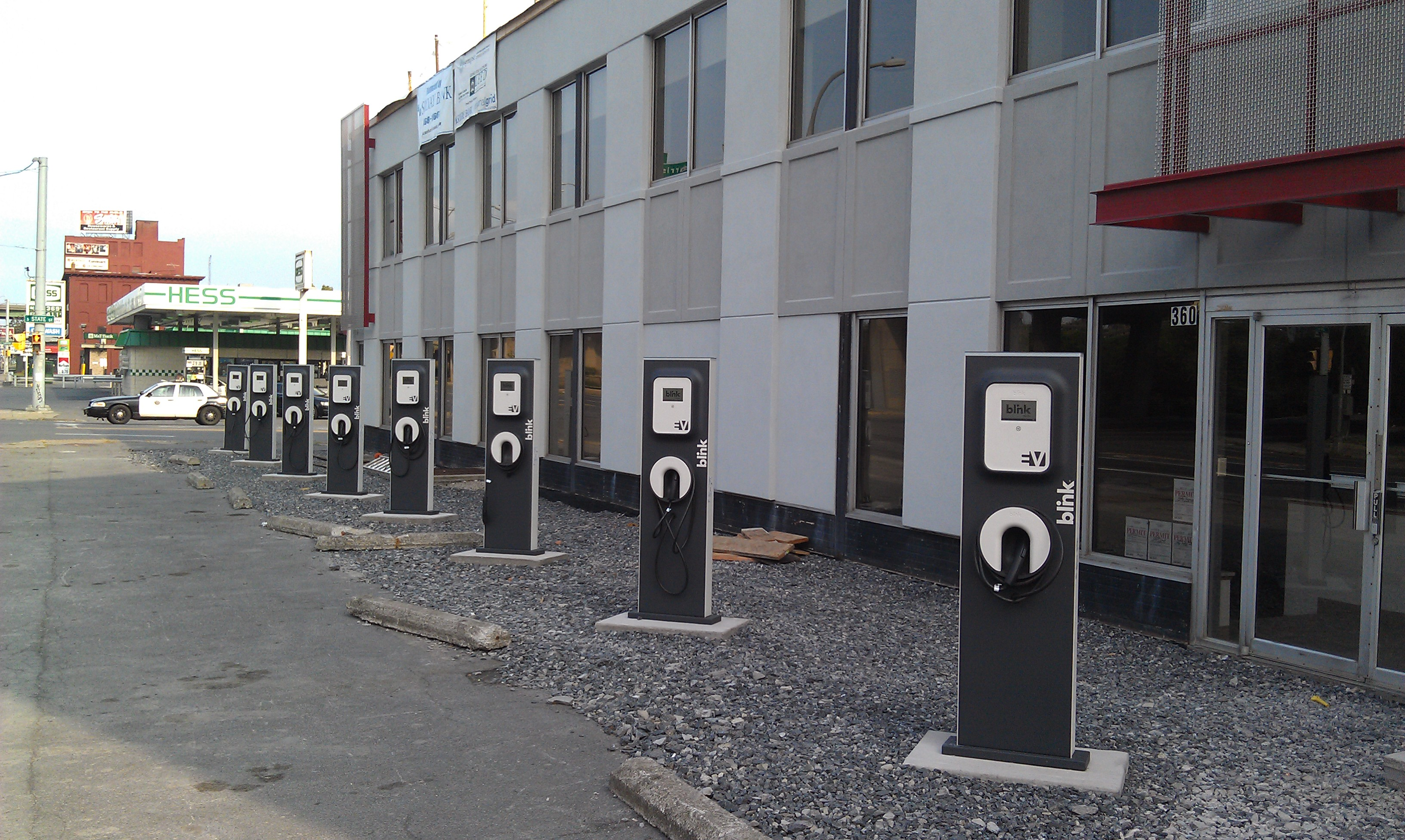
- Blink Charging stations for electric vehicles in Syracuse, New York
- Company type: Public
- Traded as: Nasdaq: BLNK
- Industry: Electric vehicle charging
- Headquarters: Bowie, Maryland, United States
- Number of locations: 106000 publicly accessible chargers (2024)
- Key people: Brendan S. Jones (president & CEO)
- Revenue: ▲US$61,139,000 (2022)
- Operating income: ▲US$(89,271,000) (2022)
- Net income: ▲US$(91,560,000) (2022)
- Total assets: ▲US$362,542,000 (2022)
- Total equity: ▲US$260,957,000 (2022)
- Website: blinkcharging.com
- Footnotes / references Financials as of December 31, 2022. References

Blink Charging Co. is an American electric vehicle charging network operator headquartered in Bowie, Maryland. One of the top three EV charging networks in the United States, it has over 90,000 chargers globally in 25 countries.

== History ==
Blink began as a brand name for the charging infrastructure of the now defunct company, Ecotality. Following Ecotality's bankruptcy the distressed assets were acquired by Michael D. Farkas and his company, Car Charging Group. The company was renamed Blink Charging on Aug 29, 2017. In March 2023, Blink was one of three EV charger suppliers chosen by the U.S. Postal Service as part of its electric vehicle fleet upgrade; Blink will supply up to 41,500 EV chargers.

== Acquisitions ==
=== Blink Network ===
In October 2013, the Blink network was acquired from ECOtality after its chapter 11 bankruptcy.

=== SemaConnect ===
In June 2022, Blink acquired SemaConnect.

=== Envoy Technologies ===
In April 2023, Blink announced its subsidiary Blink Mobility, LLC, purchased electric vehicle sharing platform developer, Envoy Technologies.
