= Tesla Supercharger =

Network of fast-charging stations

- Tesla Supercharger station in Wittenburg, Germany
- Established: September 24, 2012; 14 years ago
- Type: Electric vehicle charging network
- Region served: Worldwide (Note: Major presence in the Asia Pacific, North America, and Europe regions. Morocco and Chile are the only countries with Superchargers in Africa and South America, respectively.)
- Owner: Tesla, Inc
- Website: tesla.com/supercharger

The Tesla Supercharger network is an electric vehicle DC fast charging network built and operated by American vehicle manufacturer Tesla, Inc.

The Supercharger network was introduced on September 24, 2012, as the Tesla Model S entered production, with six stations in California. As of 1 October 2026, Tesla operates a global network of 9,007 Supercharger stations with over 85,000 connectors. The majority are located in three regions: Asia Pacific (3,610 stations), North America (3,594), and Europe (1,788).

== Technology ==
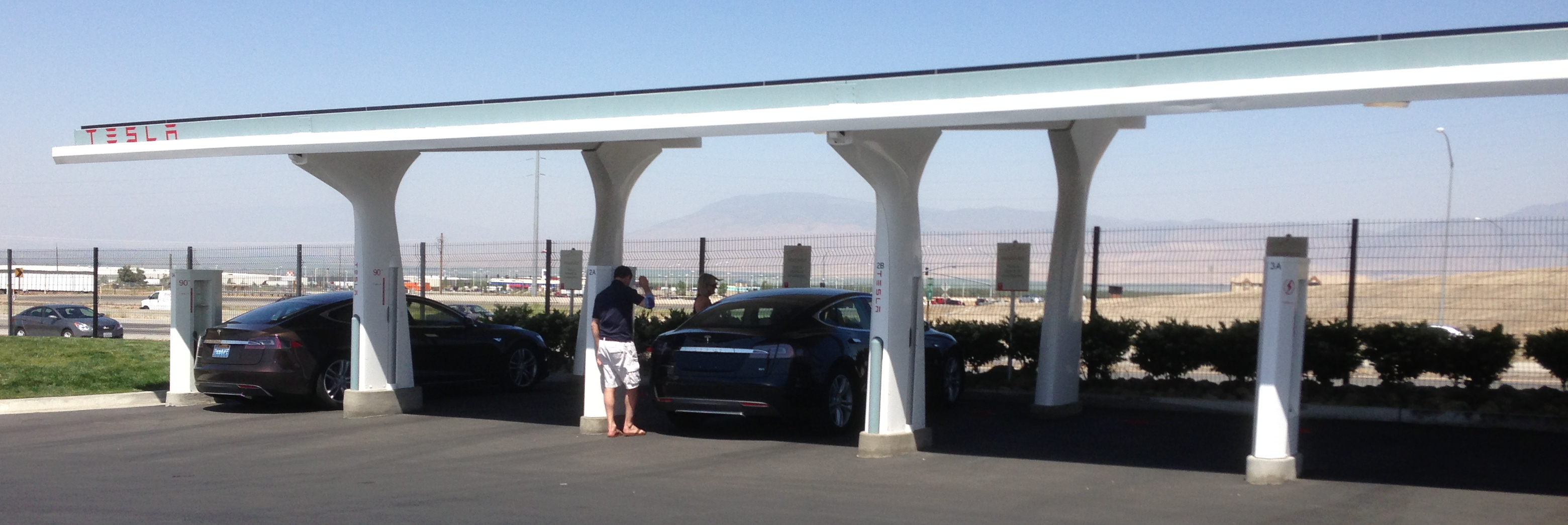
One of the earliest supercharger stations in the United States, located in Lebec, California, has a solar canopy from Tesla Energy.

Tesla typically places Superchargers near major highways at locations with amenities for drivers, such as restrooms, restaurants, and shopping. Some sites also have solar canopies and Megapack installed by Tesla Energy to offset energy use and provide drivers with protection from the elements.

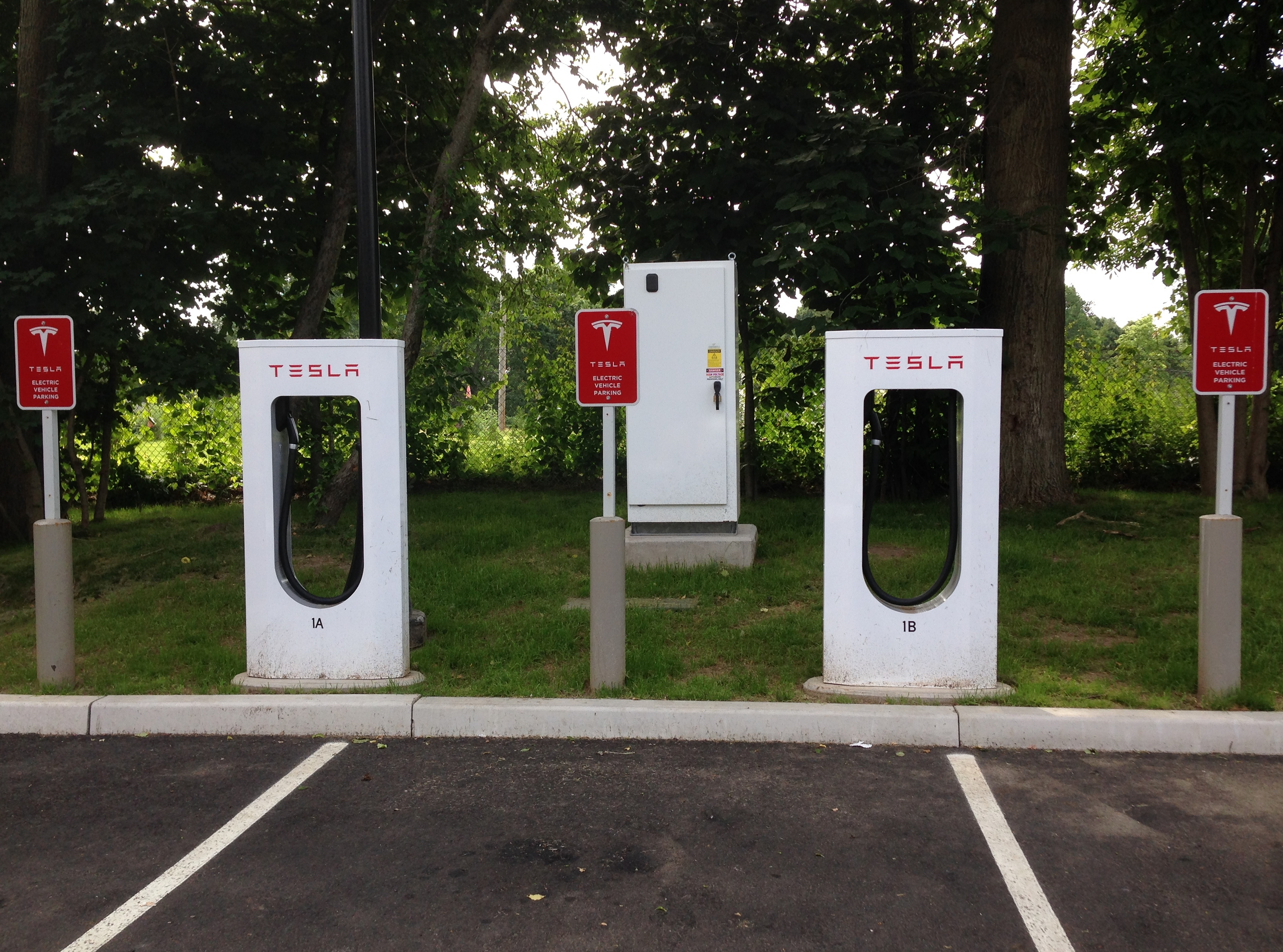
When both pairs of this V1 Tesla Supercharger station stalls (A and B) are occupied, they share the available power of up to 120 kW combined.

The original V1 and V2 Tesla supercharging stations were built with a single charger equipment cabinet consisting of four modules shared between two charge posts. When cars are connected to the two posts, and both request maximum power.

As an alternative to the Supercharger, in 2015, Tesla briefly implemented a battery swapping station at Harris Ranch in California. The Tesla battery station performed a few swaps and was discontinued shortly afterwards.

"Urban" Supercharger posts were introduced in September 2017. These more compact posts have a maximum power delivery of 72 kW but do not share equipment with other posts, allowing the maximum power to be delivered. These more compact posts are primarily deployed in urban areas such as shopping malls, parking lots, and garages. Tesla discontinued new installations around 2019 to 2020.

V3 stations were introduced in 2019 and could deliver up to 250 kW. Up to four posts can share a 350 kW charger equipment cabinet, but up to three cabinets can share power among themselves via a DC bus. In practice, in most cases, this allows each post to deliver maximum power regardless of nearby charging sessions. The V3 charge posts use a liquid-cooled cable which allows the cable to be thinner and lighter while delivering more power.

Tesla introduced mobile Supercharger stations in 2019 with several urban supercharger posts and a Tesla Megapack energy storage system mounted on a semi-trailer truck. These stations provide temporary stations for nearby events, expand capacity during peak travel seasons, or can be deployed when a station needs to be taken offline. The Megapack can charge up to 100 vehicles before being depleted.

V4 charging posts began to roll out in early 2023 and have longer cables for charging vehicles from other automakers. The charging posts have a credit card reader potentially allowing non-Tesla owners to charge without downloading the Tesla app. The charging posts can support up to 1000 volts and up to 1000 amps (A). As of January 2025, they can deliver up to 325 kW. As of Tesla's 2026 model year lineup, only the Cybertruck can charge at 325 kW.

On November 14, 2024, Tesla announced the introduction of the V4 Supercharger cabinet, which was first deployed in September 2025. This uses a new design with either 1 MW or 1.2 MW of power output between 8 stalls and the cabinets no longer connect to one another via a DC Bus. This version can support charging vehicles with 400 and 800 V systems, delivering a maximum of 250 kW and 500 kW respectively.

According to Tesla, in July 2025 the Otočac Supercharger in Croatia became the first European Supercharger station to be supported by a mobile Megapack.

Version	Image	Max power	Features / Notes
V1		90 or 120 kW	Power output reduced when another vehicle is plugged into the paired, typically neighboring, charger.
V2		120 or 150 kW	Power output reduced when another vehicle is plugged into the paired, typically neighboring, charger.
Urban		72 kW	Smaller form factor, lower power device for urban installations (installed 2017-2020).
V3		250 kW	Equipped with a thinner, lighter cable that uses liquid cooling.; Some North American sites equipped with "Magic Dock" CCS adapter for charging non-Tesla CCS Vehicles without an external NACS adapter.
V3+		325 kW	Equipped with a longer cable for charging non-Tesla vehicles.; Contains better cooling hardware than V3 stalls enabling 1000 A charging for 325 kW charging despite same backend hardware as V3 Superchargers; Some North American sites equipped with "Magic Dock" CCS adapter for charging non-Tesla CCS Vehicles without an external NACS adapter.
V4		500 kW	Outputs power at up to 800 V, allowing faster charging for electric vehicles with battery architectures above 400 V.

=== Connectors and interoperability ===
Connector standards used by Superchargers worldwide: NACS · CCS2 · GB/T

==== North America ====
In February 2023, Tesla began installing the "Magic Dock" at select V3 Supercharger locations. This dock houses a NACS (North American Charging System) to CCS1 (Combined Charging System) adapter. When a driver of a NACS-equipped vehicle charges, they simply detach the NACS connector, leaving the adapter locked in place on the charging post. However, when a CCS-equipped vehicle driver reserves a charger via the Tesla mobile app, the Magic Dock unlocks the adapter, making it available for use. The "magic" lies in the adapter's captive design—it remains securely locked either in the dock (when a NACS vehicle is charging) or onto the NACS connector (when a CCS vehicle is charging).

Tesla began rolling out V4 Supercharger posts in North America in October 2023, featuring an integrated Magic Dock and a built-in payment terminal. These upgrades allowed non-Tesla vehicles to charge without requiring a separate adapter or the Tesla app, and making Tesla eligible for federal, state, and local incentives. This included $7.5 billion in funding under the federal National Electric Vehicle Infrastructure (NEVI) program, created in 2021, to support the expansion of charging infrastructure.

However, between May 2023 and February 2024, most North American automakers committed to adopting NACS. In September 2024, SAE finalized the standardization of NACS as SAE J3400, effectively eliminating the need for future Tesla Superchargers to support CCS1. As a result, fewer than 100 V3 sites were upgraded with the Magic Dock, and fewer than 80 V4 sites had their Magic Dock adapter activated as of September 2025. Additionally, only two V4 locations globally, both located outside of North America, currently support the use of the payment terminal.

In September 2025, Tesla opened its first complete V4 Supercharger station in Redwood City, California, supporting charging up to 500 kW for passenger vehicles.

==== Europe ====
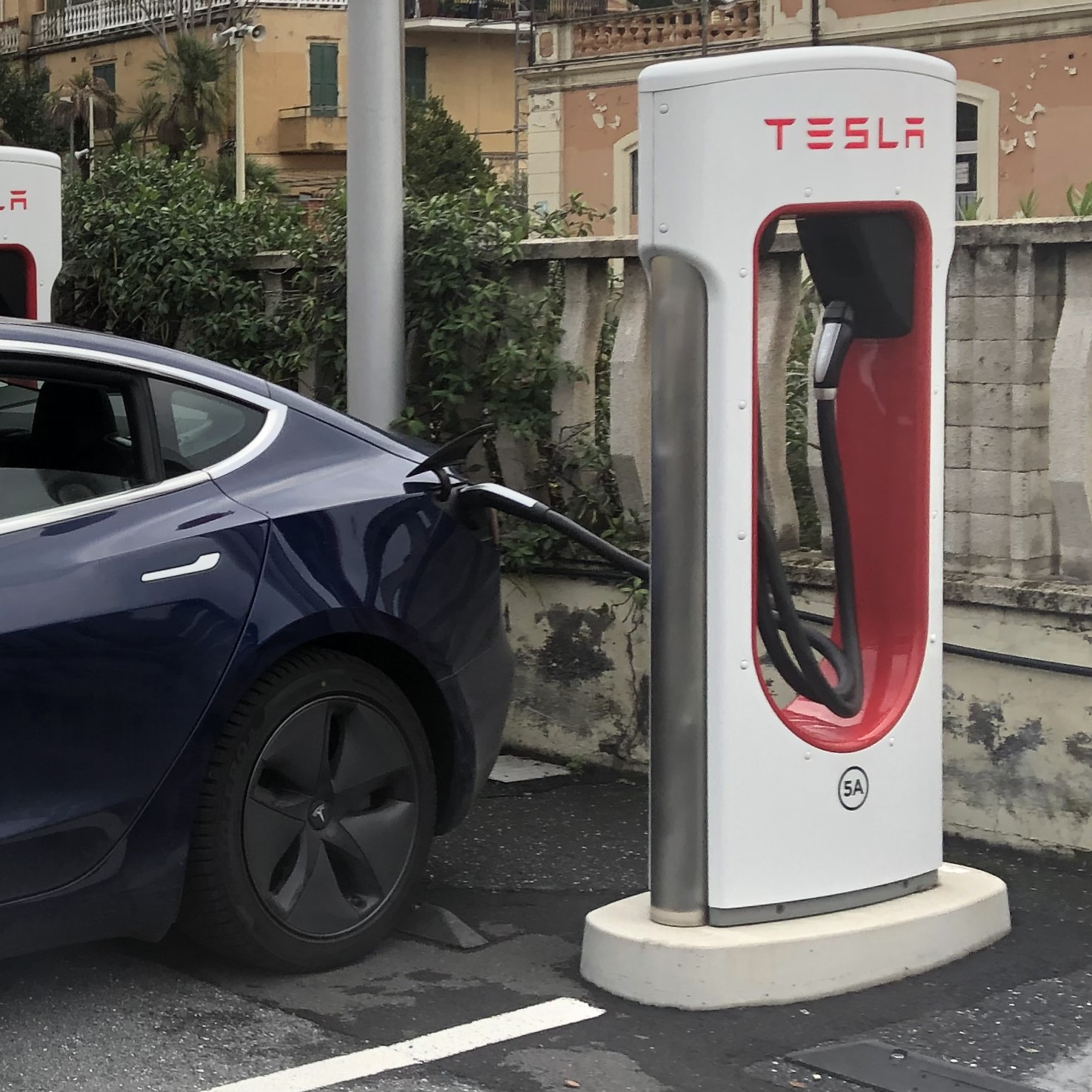
European V2 charger with dual cables, a Type 2 connector and (plugged in) CCS2

In November 2018, under pressure from European regulators, Tesla announced that it would begin using the CCS2 charging standard, adding the inlets to new vehicles, offering adapters to existing vehicle owners and adding CCS2 connectors to Superchargers.

==== China ====
In China, Tesla equips its vehicles and Superchargers with the GB/T charging standard (an abbreviation of "GuoBiao/TuiJian", translated as "recommended national standard").

== Network ==
The average number of Tesla cars per Supercharger stall was 34 in 2016. As of September 2023, Tesla bids building its chargers at about half the cost of its competitors. In 2025 the Director of Charging for North America revealed in a tweet that the cost per stall for Tesla is less than $45,000 for V3.5 Superchargers with a target of <$40,000 per stall for V4 Superchargers.. In a 2014 filing with the SEC, Tesla reported an "estimated useful life of 12 years".

Most car charging occurs at home or work, a situation that Tesla has compared to cell phone charging. As of 2014, less than 10% of charging came from Superchargers.

For 2024, Tesla states the network had 99.95% uptime (at least 50% daily capacity) and its power was 100% renewable (through solar power on-site and through purchasing electricity which was matched to renewable generation.)

In April 2024, it was reported that Tesla had laid off its entire Supercharger team, including its head, Rebecca Tinucci. Tinucci had made an initial staffing cut of 15–20% two weeks prior, as part of company-wide layoffs; after a meeting with Musk in which she proposed a massive network expansion, he demanded more layoffs. When she resisted, stating that further cuts would affect the fundamental business, he dismissed the entire team. The move was widely expected to slow deployment of stations in the short- to medium-term. Executives at charging companies have begun to prepare for Tesla to pull out of the federal National Electric Vehicle Infrastructure program, announced in 2023 with a goal to add 500,000 charging ports over the next five years. Tesla had been awarded contracts to build chargers at 69 of the 501 sites that had received funding to-date. On May 10, 2024, Musk promised to invest US$500M to expand the network that year, which would be "a significant reduction" from the original plans for 2024, according to former Tesla employees; research firm EVAdoption estimated it would mean a 77% reduction in the monthly rate of U.S. charging port deployment. The responsibilities for Supercharger construction and contract management have been taken over by Tesla's energy team.

=== Billing ===
Usage is typically billed by the energy consumed during charging. Idle fees can be charged to customers who remain plugged in after charging has been completed to discourage loitering and, beginning in 2023, some sites have begun to introduce congestion charges to discourage charging at high states of charge when charging is generally slower. All charges accrued during supercharging are billed to the Tesla account the car is associated with or to the credit card on file for that account.

Unlimited free supercharging for life was offered as a promotion for Model S and Model X cars ordered prior to January 15, 2017, and between August 2, 2019 and May 26, 2020. Unlimited supercharging was also offered during specific periods for vehicles purchased with referral codes.

Additionally, Model S and Model X cars that were ordered between January 15, 2017, and November 2, 2018, received 400 kWh (about 1,000 miles or 1,600 km) of free Supercharging credits per year. After the credits are exhausted, supercharging is billed at normal price.

== Deployment ==
As of November 2025, Tesla operates a network of 7,900 Supercharger stations with over 75,000 connectors. The network is primarily deployed in three regions: Asia Pacific (over 3,100 stations), North America (over 3,100), and Europe (over 1,500).

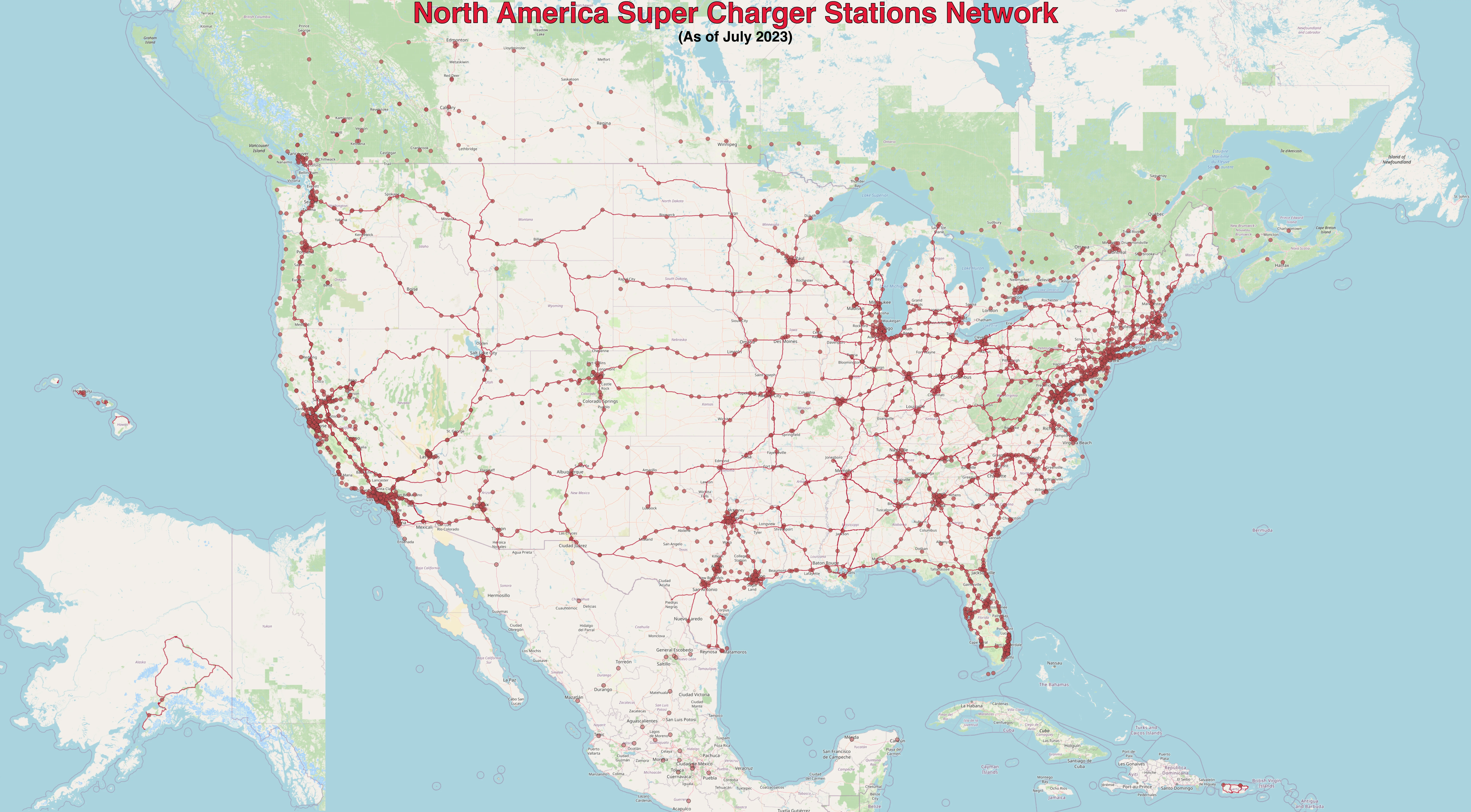
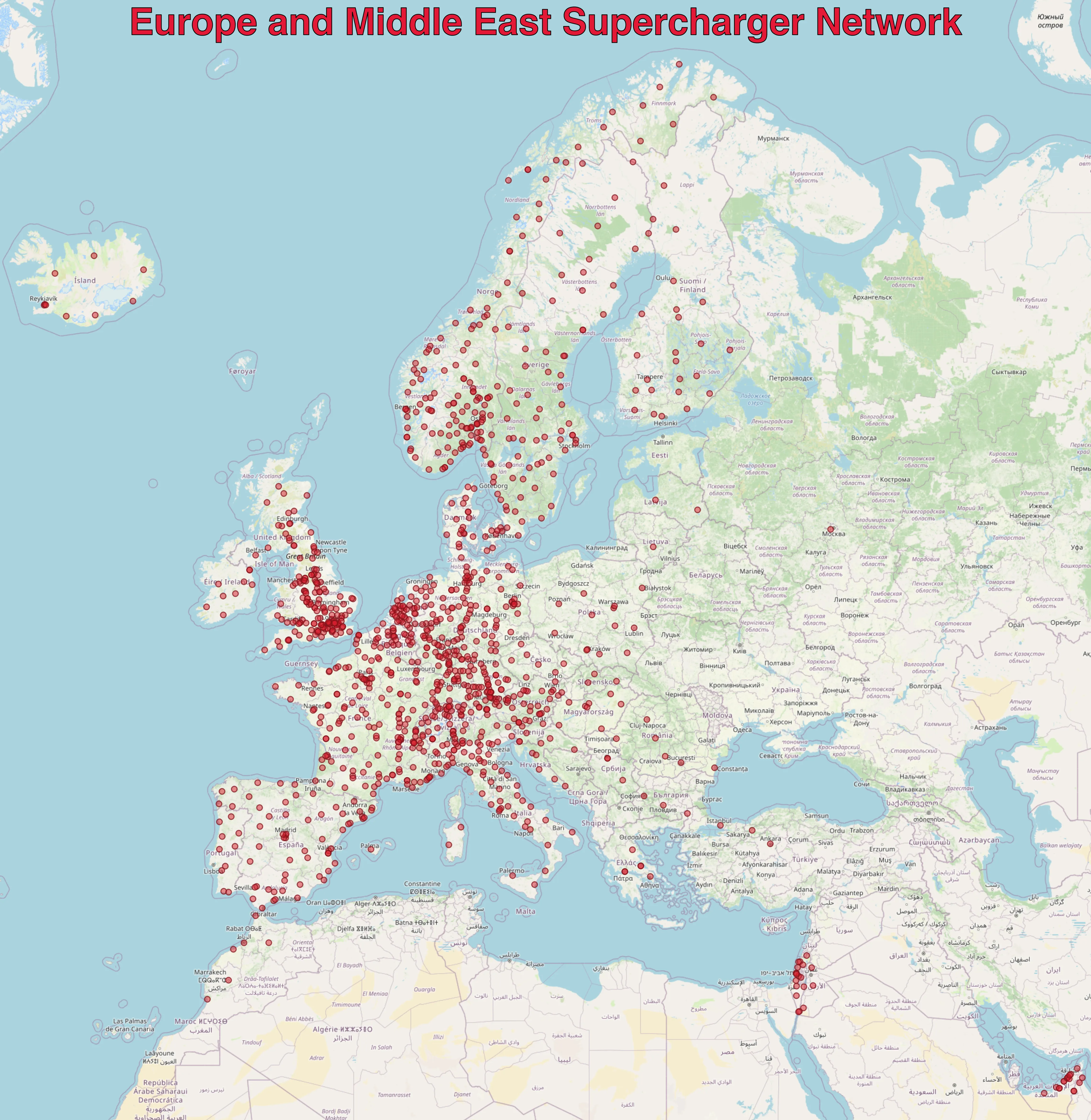
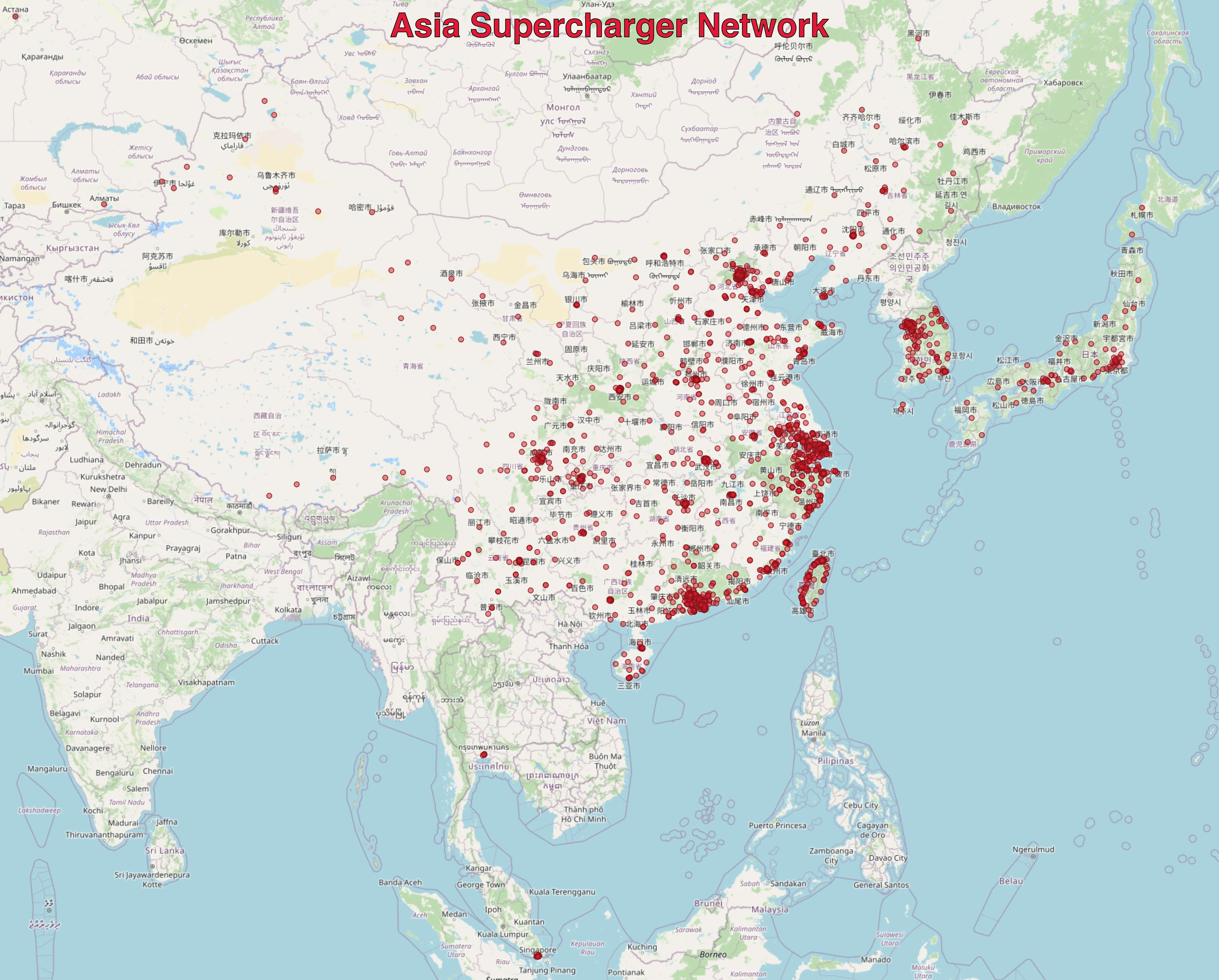
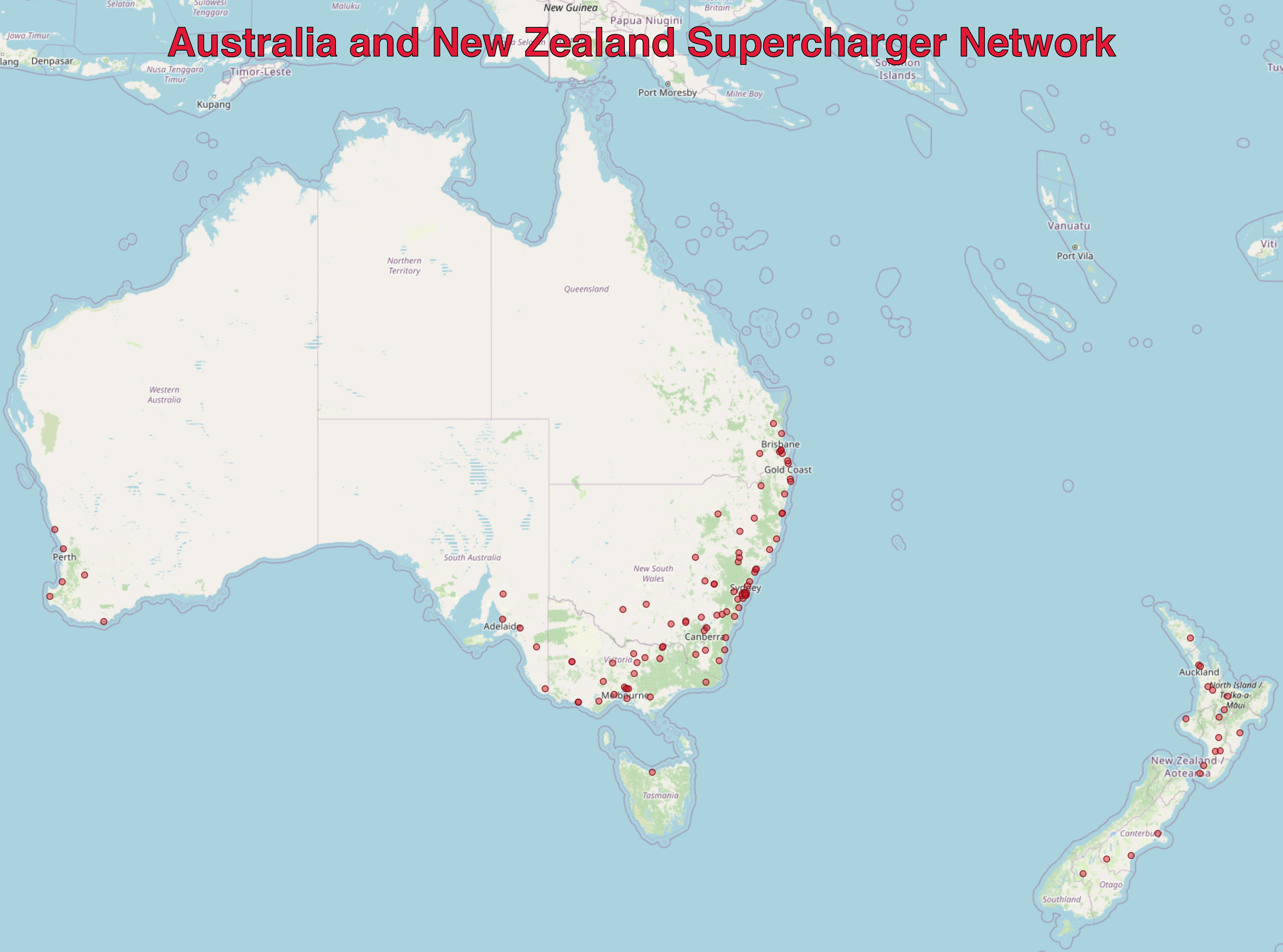

Tesla global Supercharger count
Year	Stations	Annual growth	Connectors	Annual growth	Source
2012	7	—N/a	—N/a	—N/a	
2013	63	800%	—N/a	—N/a	
2014	380	503%	—N/a	—N/a	
2015	584	54%	—N/a	—N/a	
2016	790	35%	—N/a	—N/a	
2017	1,128	43%	—N/a	—N/a	
2018	1,421	26%	12,002	—N/a	
2019	1,821	28%	16,104	34%	
2020	2,564	41%	23,277	45%	
2021	3,476	36%	31,498	35%	
2022	4,678	35%	42,419	35%	
2023	5,952	27%	54,892	29%	
2024	6,975	17%	65,495	19%	

=== North America ===
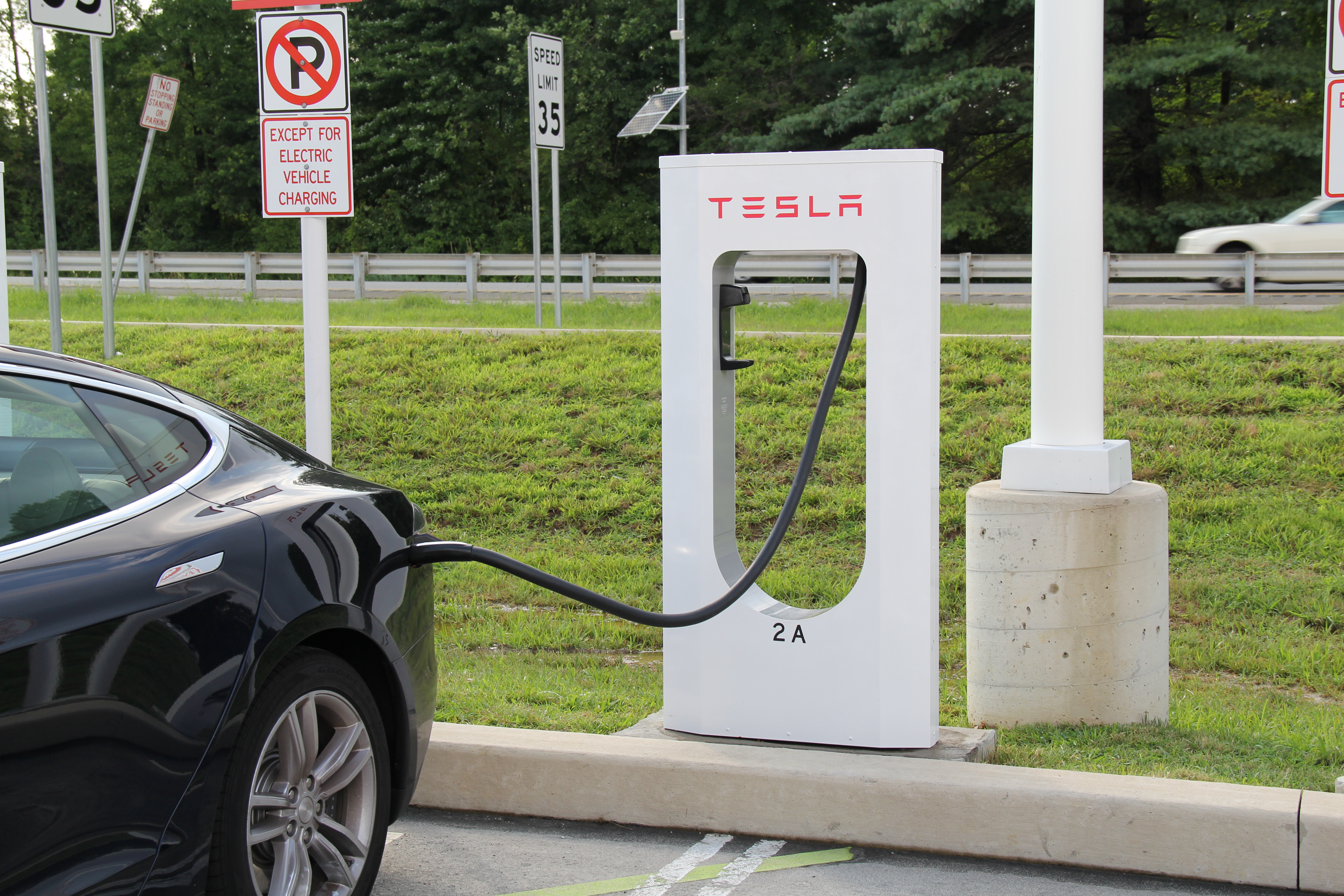
Tesla Model S charging at a Supercharger V1 stall in Newark, Delaware

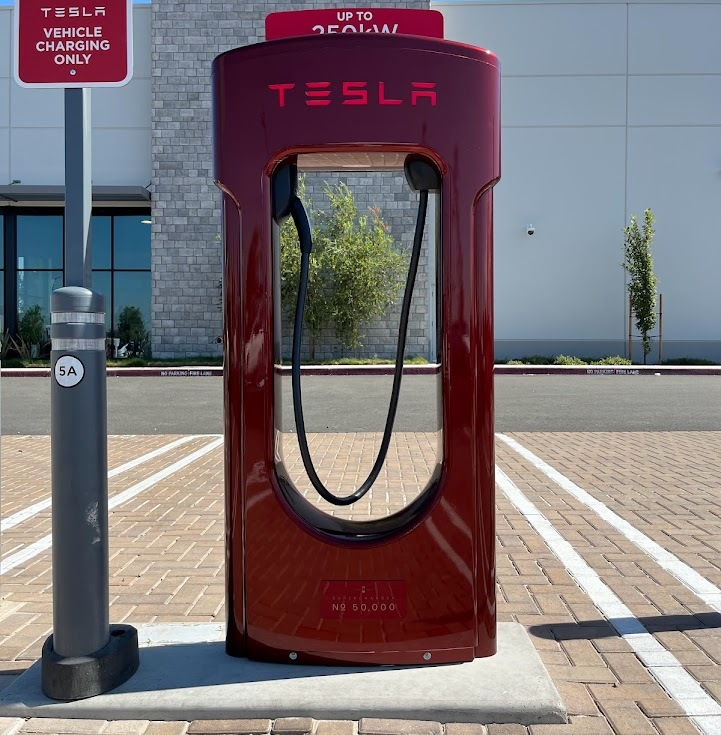
50,000th Supercharger stall in Roseville, California, with a commemorative plaque and in Ultra Red color

The first Superchargers in the world opened in 2012 in the United States, with the company initially focusing on high-traffic corridors. The first six stations enabled travel between Los Angeles, San Francisco, Lake Tahoe in California and Las Vegas, Nevada. Soon after, two stations were installed along Interstate 95 in Connecticut and Delaware, enabling trips between Boston, New York and Washington, DC. By mid-July 2013, 15 stations were open across the United States. In October 2013, Tesla announced that the entire West Coast was opened along Interstate 5 and US Route 101. In January 2014, the first coast-to-coast corridor was completed: from Los Angeles to Chicago via South Dakota, then to New York City.

Supercharging stations were available in Canada along Ontario Highway 401 and Quebec Autoroute 20 corridor between Toronto and Montreal by 2014.

As of January 2025, the United States (including Alaska, Hawaii and Puerto Rico) has over 2,500 Supercharging sites with nearly 30,000 stalls, more than any other nation in the world. Canada has 236 sites and Mexico has 38. Some stations have many stalls – the Barstow, California site has 120 stalls, Harris Ranch, California has 98 stalls, and the Lost Hills, California site is planned for 168 stalls powered by onsite solar and 39 MWh of Megapack storage without a grid connection.

=== South America ===
In October 2024, Tesla opened its first South American Superchargers in Chile. As of January 2025, the country has two Supercharging sites.

In November 2025, Tesla announced the opening of the first Supercharger in Colombia, located in Medellín.

=== Europe, Middle East and Africa ===
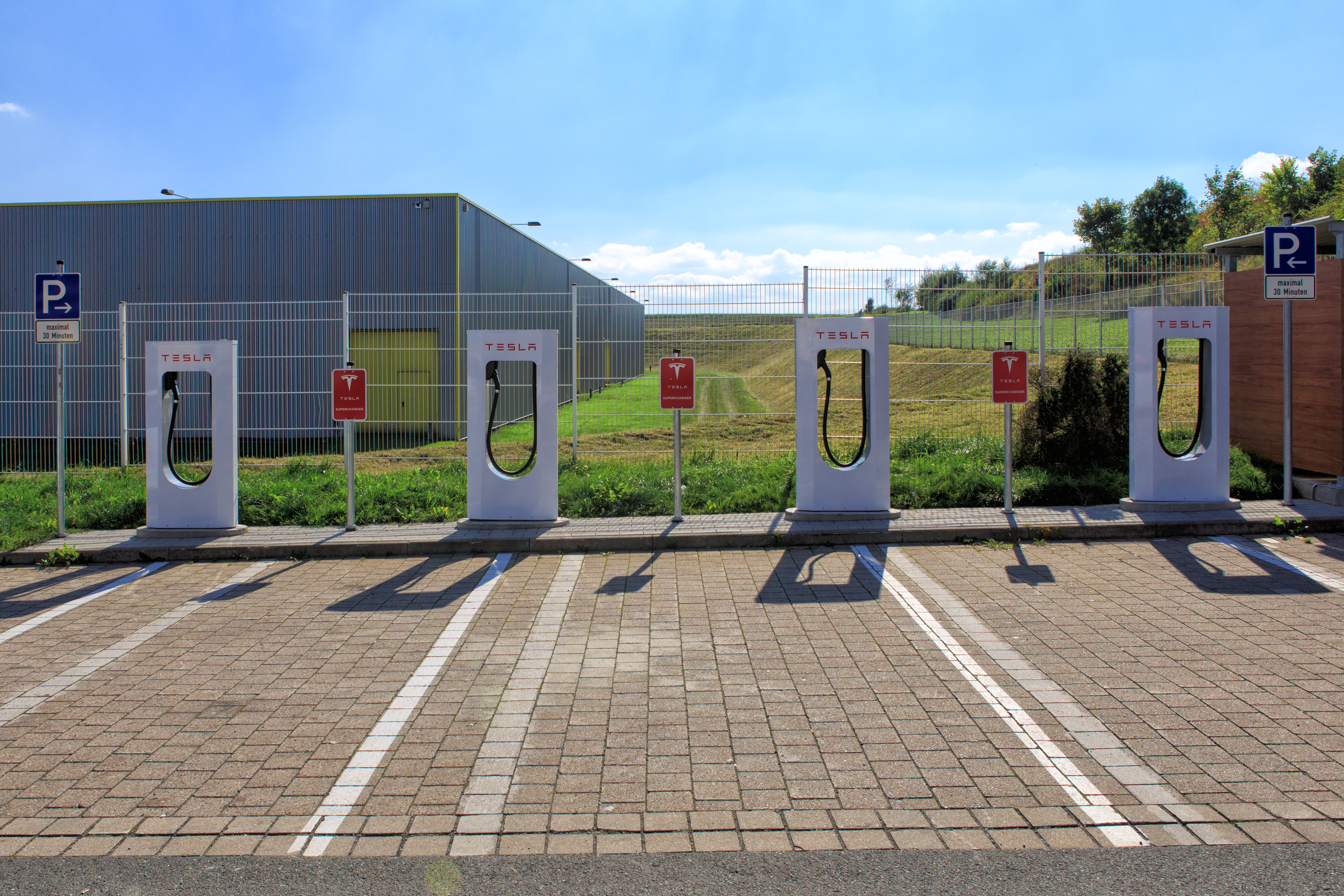
Tesla Supercharger station at a Bundesautobahn 9 rest stop near Münchberg, Germany

In early 2015, the first European Supercharger was upgraded with a 'solar canopy' (a carport with solar cells on the roof) in Køge, Denmark. According to Tesla the Supercharger had 300 m^{2} (3,230 sq ft) of solar cells with a projected annual production of 40 MWh and is, as of 2018, equipped with its own battery bank for temporary storage of excess production. In April 2016, Kostomłoty became the first charger to open in Poland. Tesla opened a grid-connected 2-stall Supercharger at Nürburgring in 2019. There are a few privately operated Supercharger stations such as the one opened on April 27, 2016, in Zarechye, Russia, with 3 stalls.

In 2015, the European Supercharger network was planned to allow a Model S to drive from the North Cape (near Honningsvåg) in Norway to Istanbul, Turkey or Lisbon, Portugal. As of August 2023, there are Supercharger stations in or near both Istanbul and Lisbon. The map of current and planned sites includes every European Union country except Malta and Cyprus, and represents all of the countries in the world in the top 10 of electric vehicle adoption rates.

Tesla started testing the charging of non-Tesla cars in the Netherlands in 2021 and in Norway in early 2022 on 15 large un-congested stations with CCS2. Tesla opened new stations for non-Tesla cars in several countries in 2022, including France, Germany, Italy, Spain, Sweden, and the United Kingdom.

In the Middle East, Israel, Jordan, Saudi Arabia, Qatar and the United Arab Emirates have sites. The only nation in Africa to have Supercharger sites is Morocco.

As of July 2024, the European region has more than 1,350 Supercharging sites across more than 20 countries.

=== Asia Pacific ===
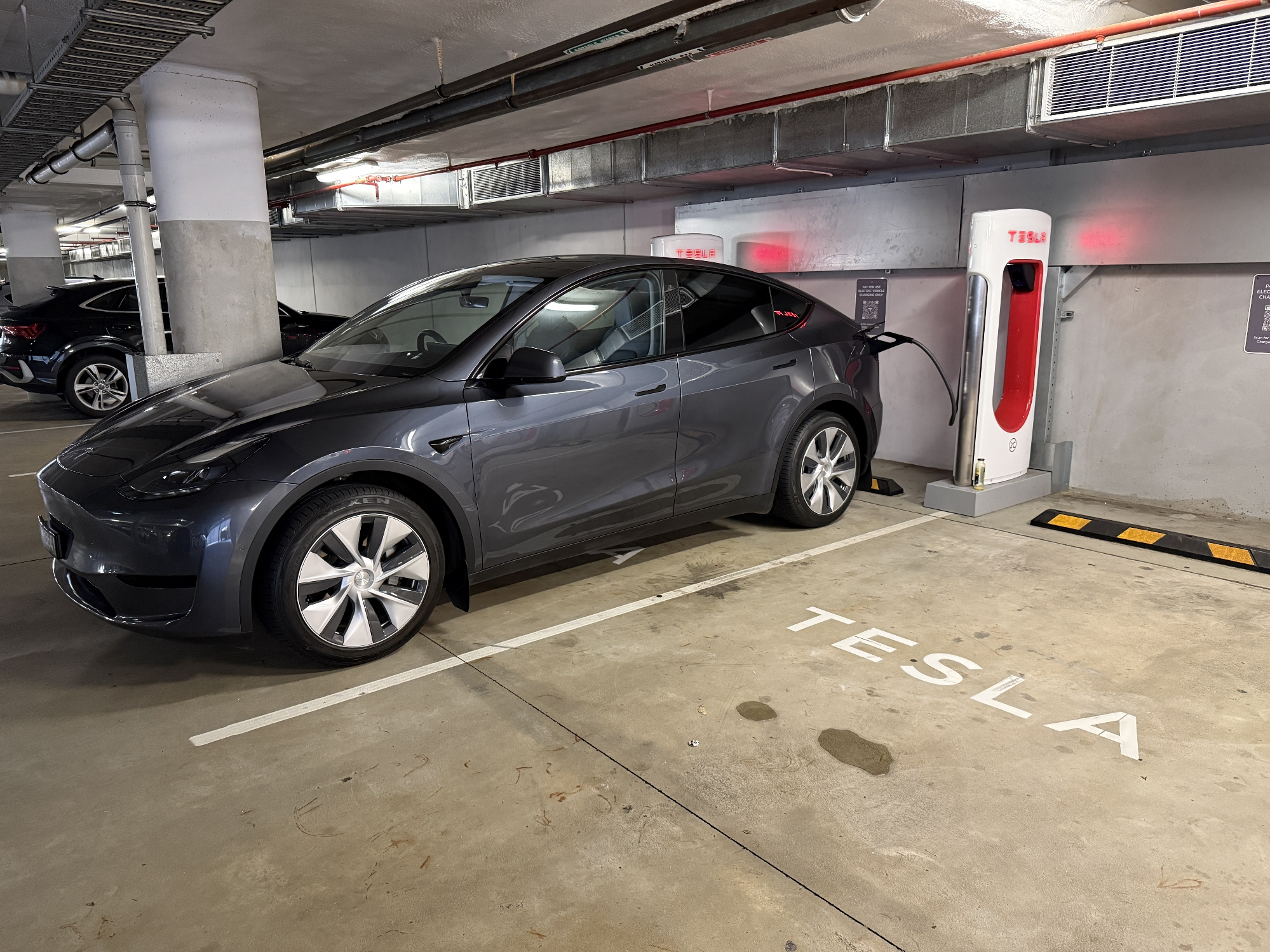
Tesla Model Y charging at a V3 stall at the Coogee Supercharger station, Perth, Western Australia.

China is the second largest market for Superchargers after the United States. Tesla operates nearly 2,200 sites in the country with over 12,350 stalls as of January 2025. Superchargers are also available in the special administrative regions of Hong Kong and Macau.

As of January 2025, other countries with Superchargers include South Korea with 165 sites, Australia with 150, Japan with 138, Taiwan with 107, Thailand with 57, New Zealand with 34, Malaysia with 25, Singapore with 15, India with 5, Philippines with 4, and Kazakhstan with 2.

== Megacharger ==
In November 2017, Tesla announced a higher-capacity Megacharger as part of the unveiling of a prototype for its Tesla Semi, a Class 8 prime mover. These Megachargers provide 400 miles (644 km) of charge in 30 minutes to the Tesla Semis.

In November 2021, the first Megacharger was installed at the Gigafactory Nevada where the Tesla Semi is built. A second Megacharger was permitted for construction at a PepsiCo facility in Modesto, California, in late 2021.

In November 2024, Tesla announced that the new V4 cabinets will have support for charging Tesla semis at up to 1.2 MW with a Megacharger.

The megawatt-class cable for the Megacharger supports three times the current density of the V3 Supercharger—35 amperes/mm^{2} versus approximately 12 for the V3. The cable is also liquid-cooled to support 1000-amp charge rates at 1000 volts in the future.

== See also ==
- Charging station
- Electric vehicle charging network
- BYD Flash Charging
- Geely Smart Charging C12
