= GB/T charging standard =

Chinese electric vehicle charging standard

The GB/T charging standard, primarily the GB/T 20234, is a set of charging station standards used in China and Belarus for AC and DC fast charging of plug-in electric vehicles, known locally as "new-energy vehicles". The term "GB/T" is an abbreviation of "national standard recommended" (Chinese: 国标推荐; pinyin: guóbiāo tuījiàn), meaning it is officially promoted as one of the National Standards of the People's Republic of China. The standards were revised and updated in 2015 by the Standardization Administration of China, and again in 2023 by China's National Automobile Standardization Technical Committee.

== Overview ==
The GB/T charging standards are comparable to similar standards from the Society of Automotive Engineers (SAE), the International Electrotechnical Commission (IEC), and the International Standards Organization (ISO) which provide general, physical, and signaling requirements for electric vehicle charging interfaces.

- GB/T 18487 provides general requirements for conductive charging systems, corresponding to IEC 61851.
- GB/T 20234 provides physical requirements for connectors and interfaces, corresponding to IEC 62196 and SAE J1772.
- GB/T 27930 provides communication requirements, corresponding to ISO 15118 and SAE J1772.

=== List of standards ===
The five referenced GB/T standards were revised and released on December 28, 2015, and two were revised again in 2023 to specify higher power delivery:

1. GB/T 20234.1-2015 Connectors for Conducting Charging for Electric Vehicles – Part 1: General Requirements
2. GB/T 20234.1-2023 Connection devices for conductive charging of electric vehicles - Part 1: General requirements
3. GB/T 20234.2-2015 Connectors for Conducting Charging for Electric Vehicles – Part 2: Alternating Current Charging Interfaces
4. GB/T 20234.3-2023 Connection devices for conductive charging of electric vehicles - Part 3: DC charging interface
5. GB/T 27930-2015 Communication Protocol between Off-board Conductive Charger and Battery Management System of Electric Vehicle

== Charging interface ==
Schematic and terminology

Common terminology:

- Socket outlet is the physical interface on the charging station
- Plug is the interface on the connecting cable that mates with the socket outlet
- Connector is the interface on the opposite end of the connecting cable that mates with the vehicle inlet
- Vehicle inlet is the physical interface on the electric vehicle

In some cases, the connecting cable is permanently mounted to the charging station and the socket outlet and plug are not used.

=== Charging modes ===
GB/T 20234.1 defines three different charging modes:

GB/T 20234.1 charging modes
Charging Mode	Coupler type	Rated voltage	Rated current	Max power
2	AC (20234.2)	250 V AC	10 A	27.7 kW
2	AC (20234.2)	250 V AC	16 A	27.7 kW
2	AC (20234.2)	250 V AC	32 A	27.7 kW
3	AC (20234.2)	440 V AC	16 A	27.7 kW
3	AC (20234.2)	440 V AC	32 A	27.7 kW
3	AC (20234.2)	440 V AC	63 A	27.7 kW
4	DC (20234.3-2023)	not exceeding 1500 V DC	not exceeding 800 A	1200 kW

=== AC charging ===
GB/T 20234.2—2015
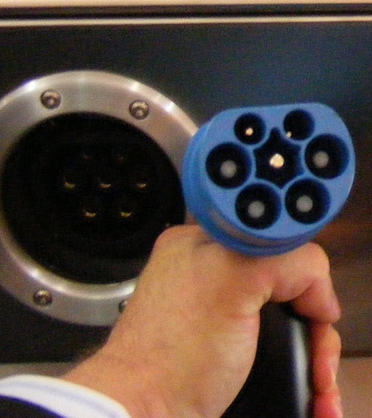
- GB/T AC charging station female socket outlet and connecting cable male plug (blue). A male interface is used for both ends of connecting cables.
- Type: Electric vehicle charging

Production history
- Designer: Mennekes
- Designed: 2009
- Produced: 2013

General specifications
- Length: 34 mm (1.3 in), male vehicle connector; 44.5 mm (1.75 in), male plug
- Diameter: 51 mm (2.0 in), male
- Width: 51 mm (2.0 in), male
- Height: 44 mm (1.7 in), male
- Pins: 7 (1 earth, 3 line phases, 1 neutral, 2 signalling)
- Connector: VDE-AR-E 2623-2-2

Electrical
- Signal: 1 phase AC
- Earth: Dedicated pin
- Max. voltage: 440 V
- Max. current: 63 A

Pinout
- Pinouts for GB/T 20234.2 (male interface)
CC	Charging confirmation	pre-insertion signalling
CP	Control pilot	post-insertion signalling
PE	Protective earth	full-current protective earthing system—6-millimetre (0.24 in) diameter
N	Neutral	single-phase AC
L1	Line 1	single-phase AC
L2	Line 2	back-up contact
L3	Line 3	back-up contact

The AC standard (GB/T 20234.2) uses male and female connectors physically compatible with the European Type 2 connector, but with different configurations and signaling. While the European implementation of Type 2 (IEC 62196-2 Type 2) uses a female connector and male vehicle inlet, GB/T 20234.2 specifies a male connector and female vehicle inlet. Both IEC 62196-2 Type 2 and GB/T 20234.2 specify a female socket outlet and male plug. In addition, GB/T 20234.2 uses CC/CP (charging confirmation and control pilot) signals, instead of PP/CP (proximity pilot and control pilot) signaling.

For the male plug and connector ends, the shape is a flattened circle with a nominal outer diameter of 51 mm (2.0 in); the flattened section reduces this to 44 mm (1.7 in), measured top to bottom.

It allows mode 2 (250 V) or mode 3 (440 V) single-phase AC charging at up to 8 or 27.7 kW, respectively. In Mode 2, power is supplied with a current of 10/16/32A and voltage of 250V. In Mode 3, power is supplied with a current of 16/32/63A and voltage of 440V. Although the seven-pin interface is capable of passing three-phase AC power, the current implementation is limited to single-phase power.

In general, charging speeds are also limited by the vehicle's on board charger, which is usually less than 10 kW. The on-board charger converts the AC input power to DC.

=== DC fast charging ===
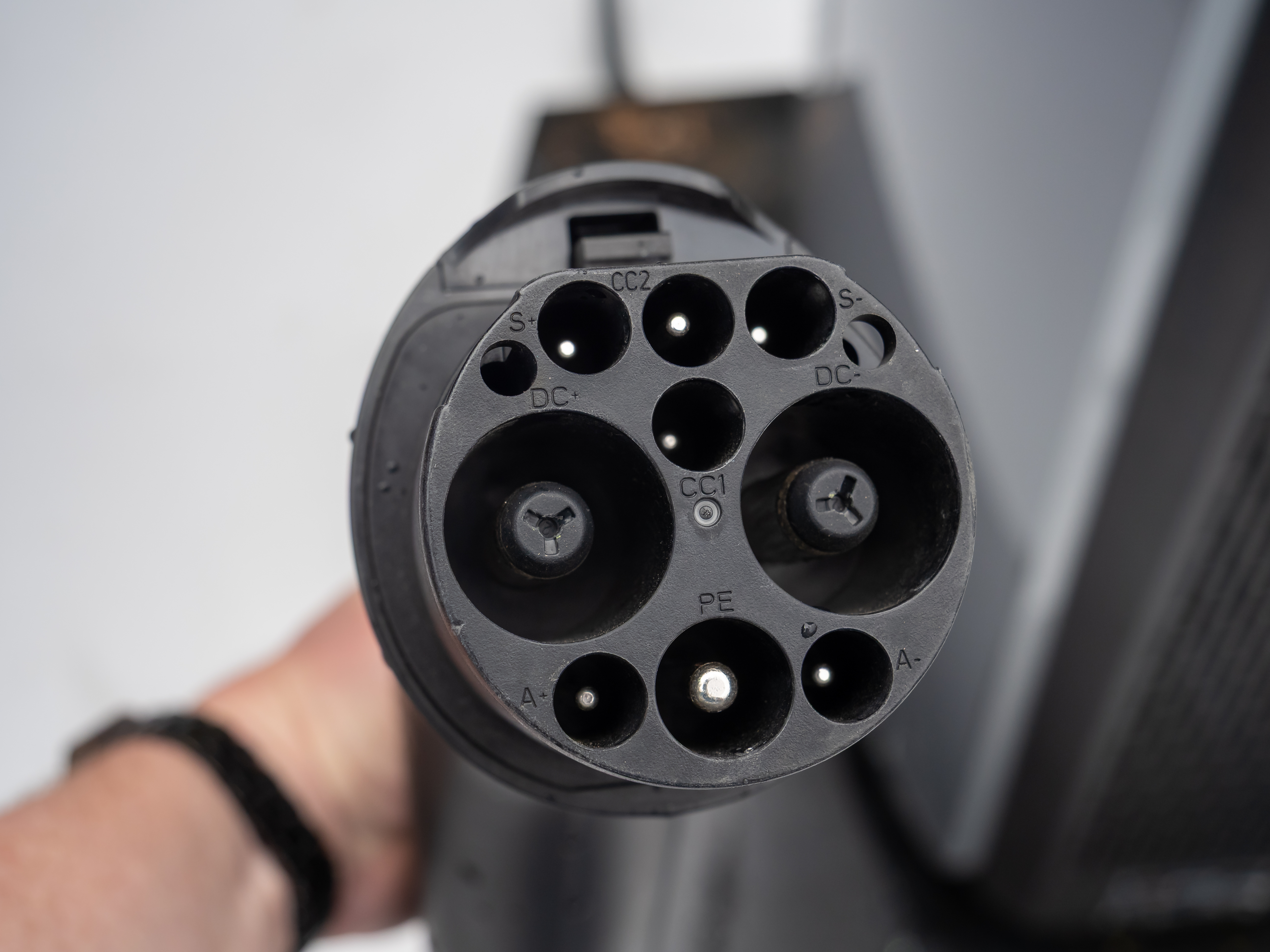
DC fast charging connector

GB/T 20234.3—2015
- Type: Electric vehicle charging

General specifications
- Length: 45 mm (1.8 in), male vehicle connector
- Diameter: 65 mm (2.6 in), male
- Width: 65 mm (2.6 in), male
- Height: 60.8 mm (2.39 in), male
- Pins: 9 (1 earth, 2 DC power, 2 auxiliary power, 4 signalling)

Electrical
- Signal: DC
- Earth: Dedicated pin
- Max. voltage: 1500 V
- Max. current: 800 A

Pinout
- Pinouts for GB/T 20234.3 (male vehicle connector interface)
S+ / S−	Charging communication	CAN_H / CAN_L
CC1 / CC2	Charging confirmation	post-insertion signalling
DC+ / DC−	Main DC power	positive / negative
PE	Protective earth	full-current protective earthing system
A+ / A−	Auxiliary DC power	12V +/-5%, 10A

The DC fast charging standard (GB/T 20234.3) uses a different, larger connector and allows for fast charging at up to 1200 kW, with voltage not exceeding 1500 V DC and a maximum continuous operating current not exceeding 800 A. However, 50 kW or other lower-rated power chargers are more commonly seen, typically retaining the minimum GB/T voltage of 750V but with different current ratings. Some chargers may also follow the physical plug specified by GB/T 20234.3 but not the GB/T standard power limits by using a lower voltage than 750V, such as 500V.

The male vehicle connector has a flattened circular shape similar to that of the Type 2 connector used for single-phase AC charging. The DC charging connector specified in GB/T 20234.3 has a nominal outer diameter of 65 mm (2.6 in); the flattened top reduces the top-to-bottom height to 60.8 mm (2.39 in). There are four pins for signaling: two to provide charging confirmation (CC1 / CC2) and two for communication via CAN bus (S+ / S−). In addition, the GB/T 20234.3 connector provides up to 600 W of auxiliary DC power at 30V/20A (A+ / A−).

As of December 2019, 40% of all electric vehicles sold to date with DC fast charging capability were equipped with GB/T 20234.3 inlets, a plurality compared with the next-most prevalent (Tesla's proprietary inlet, with 19% share), reflecting the scale of the EV market in China. CCS (Combo1 + Combo2) was in third place, with a 17% share including European Tesla vehicles equipped with CCS Combo2 ports, followed closely by CHAdeMO (15%).

Maximum charging speed is limited by a variety of factors aside from the charger's full rated power. For example:

- Some chargers may not be able to supply the full rated power if the car battery voltage is too low, as the current draw needed would exceed the charger's current rating.
- Some cars, even if they match the maximum voltage supplied by the charger, may not to be able to handle the full rated power as the high current draw could result in excessive heat.
- Cars with battery voltages higher than the charger's voltage rating will not be able to charge at all (e.g. chargers with the minimum GB/T voltage of 750V will not be able to charge a 800V battery) unless the vehicle itself has an onboard method to step up the voltage, such as through the use of a boost converter.

Shortly after the GB/T 20234.3-2015 standard came out in 2015, practical experience demonstrated the locking system did not function as well as intended and the connector was too easily damaged. Although revisions to the 20234.3 standard were planned, it became clear that a new, more robust connector was needed. China Electricity Council and CHAdeMO developed a new unified ChaoJi system in 2020 capable of delivering DC power at a maximum rate of 900 kW, with current of 600A, and voltage of 1500V. The new connector could replace both GB/T DC and CHAdeMO, featuring backward compatibility for GB/T DC, CHAdeMO and CCS, all with adapters. Since then the 2023 revision of the GB/T standard increased power delivery to 1200 kW.

== Signalling ==
The GBT connector uses CAN BUS signaling for control, specifically, GB/T 27930-2015 is largely based on the SAE J1939 network protocol. This is unlike the power line communication (PLC) control protocol used in the competing CCS standard, which originated from the European Type 2 connector and North American SAE J1772 (Type 1) standards for AC charging.

The signals control the processes of charging, such as handshake initiation and recognition, amperage and voltage configuration, charging and suspension of charging. Charging communication is defined in GB/T 27930-2015 using digital signals following the CAN 2.0B bus protocol at a rate of 250 kbit/sec. In the first handshaking stage, the S+/S- charging communication contacts are connected, then the A+/A- auxiliary power contacts are connected. The EVSE sends a handshaking signal to the EV battery monitoring system (BMS) to confirm S+/S- connection, and once the BMS responds affirmatively, the EVSE begins insulation monitoring, then sends the appropriate insulation-safe message to the BMS. When the BMS acknowledges the insulation-safe message, the EVSE and BMS begin the next charging parameter configuration stage. In this stage, the BMS sends battery charging parameters to the EVSE and the EVSE responds with the maximum output capacity; after this message is acknowledged by the BMS, the BMS evaluates if the EV meets the conditions for charging, then sends a message stating the BMS is ready. Once the BMS-ready signal is acknowledged, the EVSE checks if the charger is ready and sends a charger-ready signal back to the BMS; after the charger-ready signal is acknowledged by the BMS, the next charging stage begins. In this stage, the BMS sends signals to start charging and current battery state to the EVSE, which adjusts output current accordingly in a continuous feedback loop until either the BMS or EVSE sends a stop-charging message.
