= SAE J3105 =

Process for automated charging of vehicles

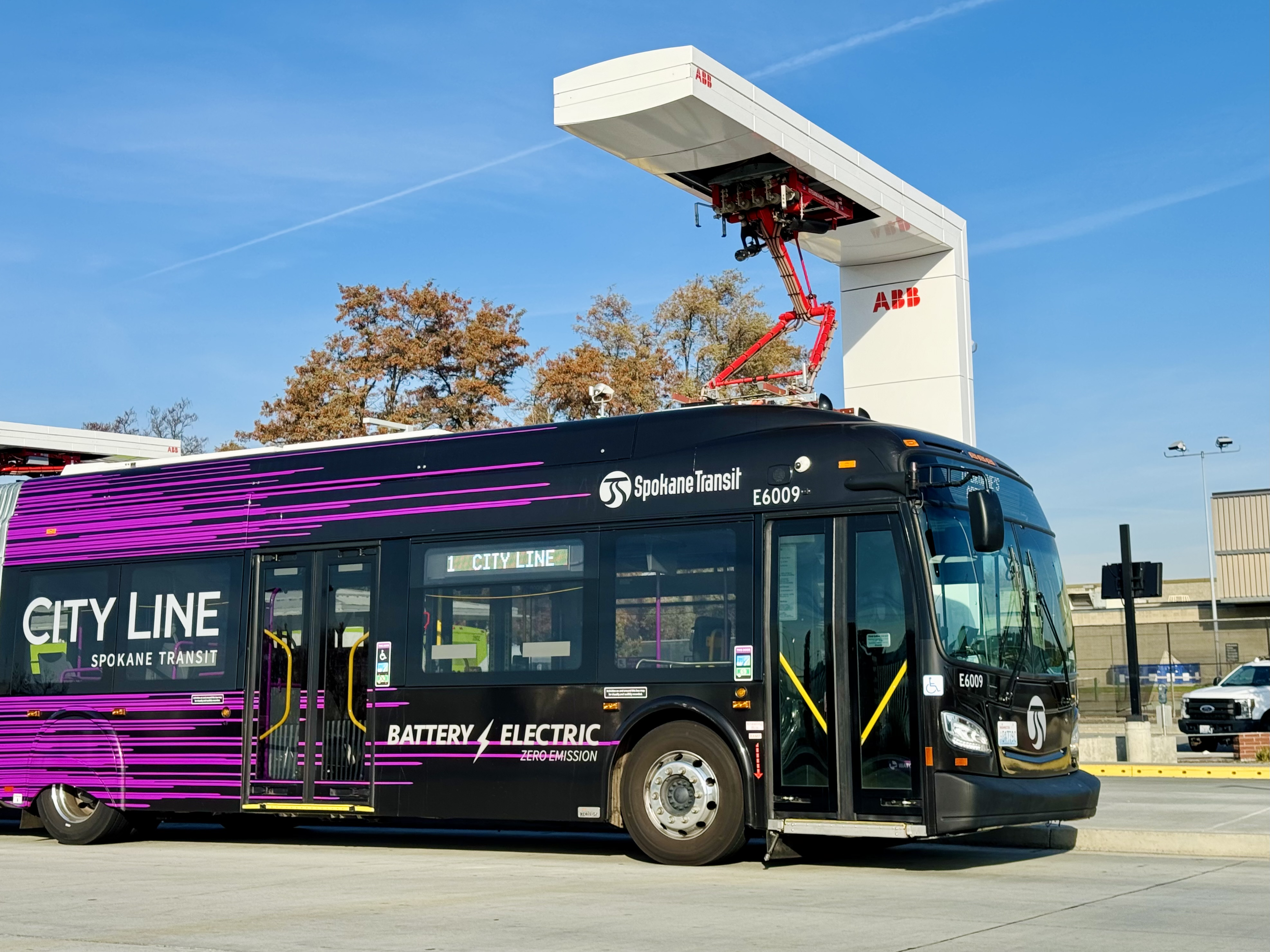
- ABB SAE J3105-1 station for Spokane Transit City Line
- Type: Automotive power connector

Production history
- Manufacturer: ABB, Heliox, SCHUNK, Siemens, Stäubli and others
- Produced: 2016+

General specifications
- Pins: 4

Electrical
- Signal: DC

Pinout
+	DC	DC Power (positive)
–	DC	DC Power (negative)
PE	Protective earth	full-current protective earthing system
CP	Control pilot	post-insertion signalling
- WiFi (IEEE 802.11n) used for pre-insertion signalling

SAE J3105 is a recommended practice for automated connection devices (ACD) that mate chargers with battery electric buses and heavy-duty vehicles. The practice is maintained by the SAE International with the formal title "Electric Vehicle Power Transfer System Using Conductive Automated Connection Devices Recommended Practice", and was first issued in January 2020. It covers the general physical, electrical, functional, testing, and performance requirements for automated conductive DC power transfer systems intended for heavy duty vehicles, focusing primarily on transit buses.

J3105 defines a common automated conductive charging system architecture so that any vehicle selecting one of the supplemental specific ACD implementations can use any charger that complies with that specific implementation, regardless of manufacturer, similar to how the earlier IEC 62196, SAE J1772, and SAE J3068 standards define the characteristics for a manually-plugged electric vehicle supply equipment interface.

== History ==
SAE formed the Medium and Heavy-Duty Vehicle Conductive Charging Task Force in 2016 to develop a recommended practice for heavy-duty electric vehicle conductive charging. Participants in the Task Force included transit bus manufacturers (Gillig, New Flyer, Nova Bus, Proterra), charger manufacturers (ABB, Heliox, Opbrid, Siemens, Toshiba), interface manufacturers (Furrer+Frey, Schunk Group, Stäubli, Stemmann), electric utilities (EPRI, SMUD, SCE), transit operators (APTA, CTA, King County Metro, LACMTA, NYCTA), and interested parties (ANL, CalStart, CEC, CTE).

The Task Force first published the SAE J3068 recommended practice in 2018, building on work from existing international standards for charging using three-phase AC power. J3068 defines a manual Type 2 connector that can be used for both AC charging or DC charging up to 1000 V.

== General design characteristics ==
Transit operators may use opportunity charging (Note: Opportunity charging is also known as layover, on-route, or fast charging (350 kW+ charging rates). Because the charging is done while the bus is in revenue service, opportunity charging locations are selected by dwell times and route schedules. Fast chargers at high power are used to shorten charge times.) (OppCharge) to extend the range of electric buses while stopped on a layover. This is in contrast to depot charging, (Note: Depot charging (also known as base or slow charging, 50 – 100 kW) is similar to operations with conventionally-fueled (diesel, natural gas, or hydrogen) buses, where refueling is performed at bus maintenance and storage depots. Depot charging can be performed at lower power because the charging buses will not be returning to service for several hours.) where the buses are charged at a common garage or storage facility while out of service. An ACD system may be used for both opportunity and depot charging. For instance, the Schiphol Airport bus depot has overhead chargers at both 30 kW (depot charging) and 450 kW (opportunity charging) for its all-electric bus fleet.

J3105 defines two current levels of DC charging, with supply voltage from 250 to 1000 V:

1. Up to 600 A (350 kW)
2. Up to 1200 A (1200 kW)

These levels are mutually compatible; for instance, a Level 1 vehicle could connect to a Level 2 charger and would receive an appropriate amount of power. Specific requirements for the charging station and communication are governed by IEC 61851-23 and ISO 15118.

When a vehicle approaches a charger, wireless communications via IEEE 802.11n will pair the vehicle and charger. The initial communication will be used to guide the vehicle's driver to an appropriate position so the connection can be made, and communications will go through the Control Pilot interface after the vehicle is connected.

Relative sizes of the infrastructure-mounted connectors for the three J3105 implementations. J3105-1 includes the vehicle-mounted rails (arranged horizontally). The arrow indicates the forward direction of travel for the vehicle.

Only four interface connections are defined by J3105. The specific physical interfaces are defined in the supplemental recommended practices.

1. + DC Power (+)
2. – DC Power (–)
3. PE Ground / Protective Earth
4. CP Control Pilot

== Specific charging implementations ==
J3105 includes three supplemental recommended practices for specific ACD implementations:

1. J3105-1 "Infrastructure-Mounted Cross Rail Connection" (or "Cross rail"): the overhead charging station extends contacts down on a pantograph to meet roof-mounted vehicle rails
2. J3105-2 "Vehicle-Mounted Pantograph Connection" (or "Bus up"): the vehicle extends a pantograph up from its roof to meet overhead charging station contacts
3. J3105-3 "Enclosed Pin and Socket Connection": the charging station extends a pin horizontally into a vehicle's roof-mounted socket

The physical characteristics are described in the specific ACD implementations. Each of the recommended practices for specific ACD implementations includes the conductor dimensions and spacing, and the required alignment and connection procedure.

A small amount of misalignment is tolerated, depending on the specific implementation:

J3105 nominal alignment requirements
Supplement	Location (Note: Distance measured from centerline of front door to centerline of vehicle-mounted contacts, towards the rear of the bus, unless otherwise noted.)		Roll angle (Note: Angle of vehicle body relative to a plane perpendicular to the street.)		Pitch angle (Note: Angle of vehicle wheelbase relative to the street plane.)		Yaw angle (Note: Angle of vehicle (along its length) relative to curb line.)
Supplement	Location		Towards curb	Away from curb	Up	Down	Yaw angle
J3105-1 "Cross rail"	1,170 ± 150 mm 46.1 ± 5.9 in		3.5°	3.5°	5.0°	5.0°	5.0°
J3105-2 "Bus up"	0 ± 50 mm 0.0 ± 2.0 in (Note: Measured to centerline of hood with charging contacts.)		4.0°	2.0°	5.0°	5.0°	2.0°
J3105-3 "Pin"	1,000 ± 10 mm 39.37 ± 0.39 in	3,050 ± 10 mm 120.08 ± 0.39 in (Note: Measured from ground vertically up to centerline of funnel.)	5.0°	5.0°	5.0°	5.0°	5.0°

=== Cross rail (J3105-1) ===
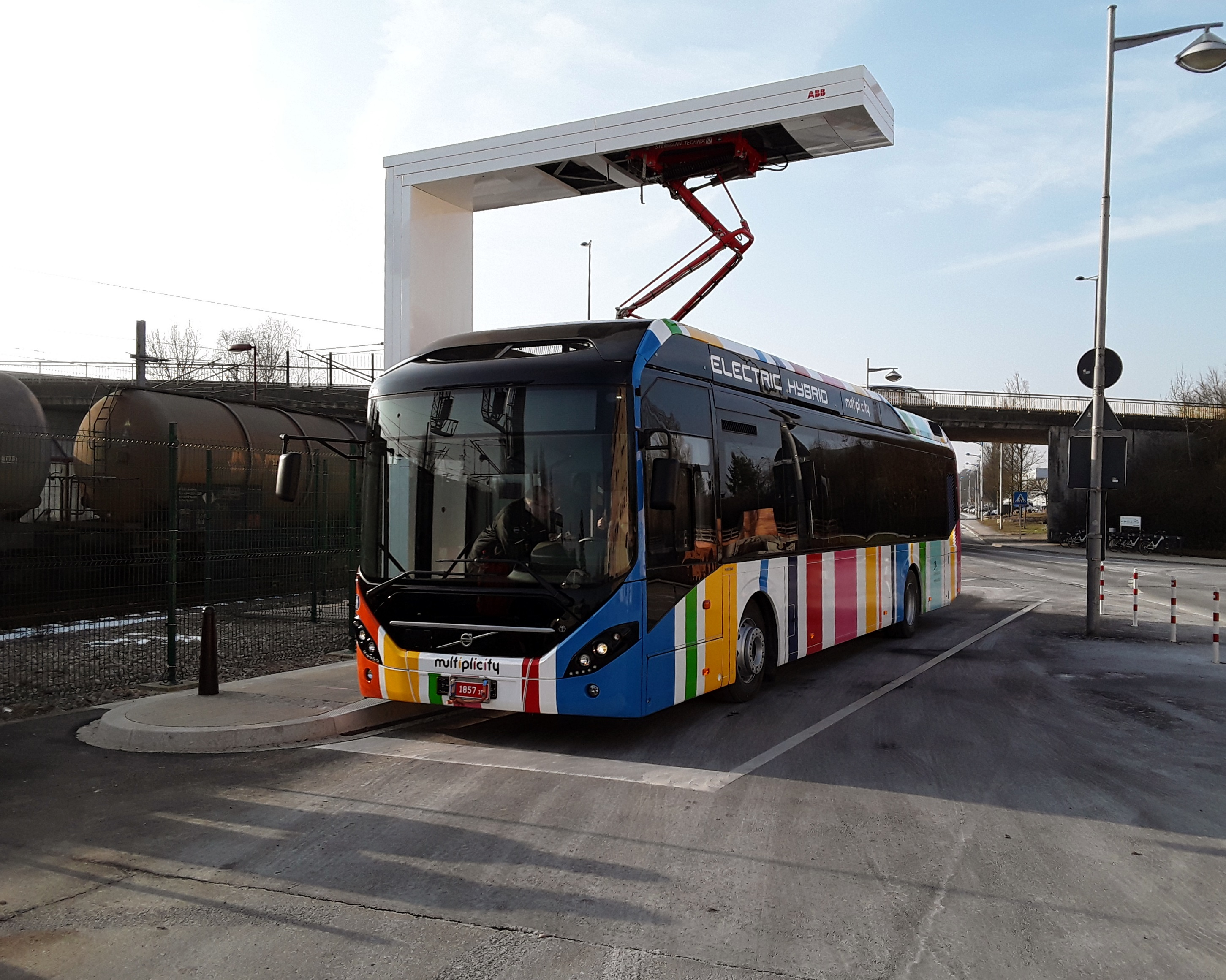
ABB cross rail charger with Volvo 7900 at the first OppCharge station

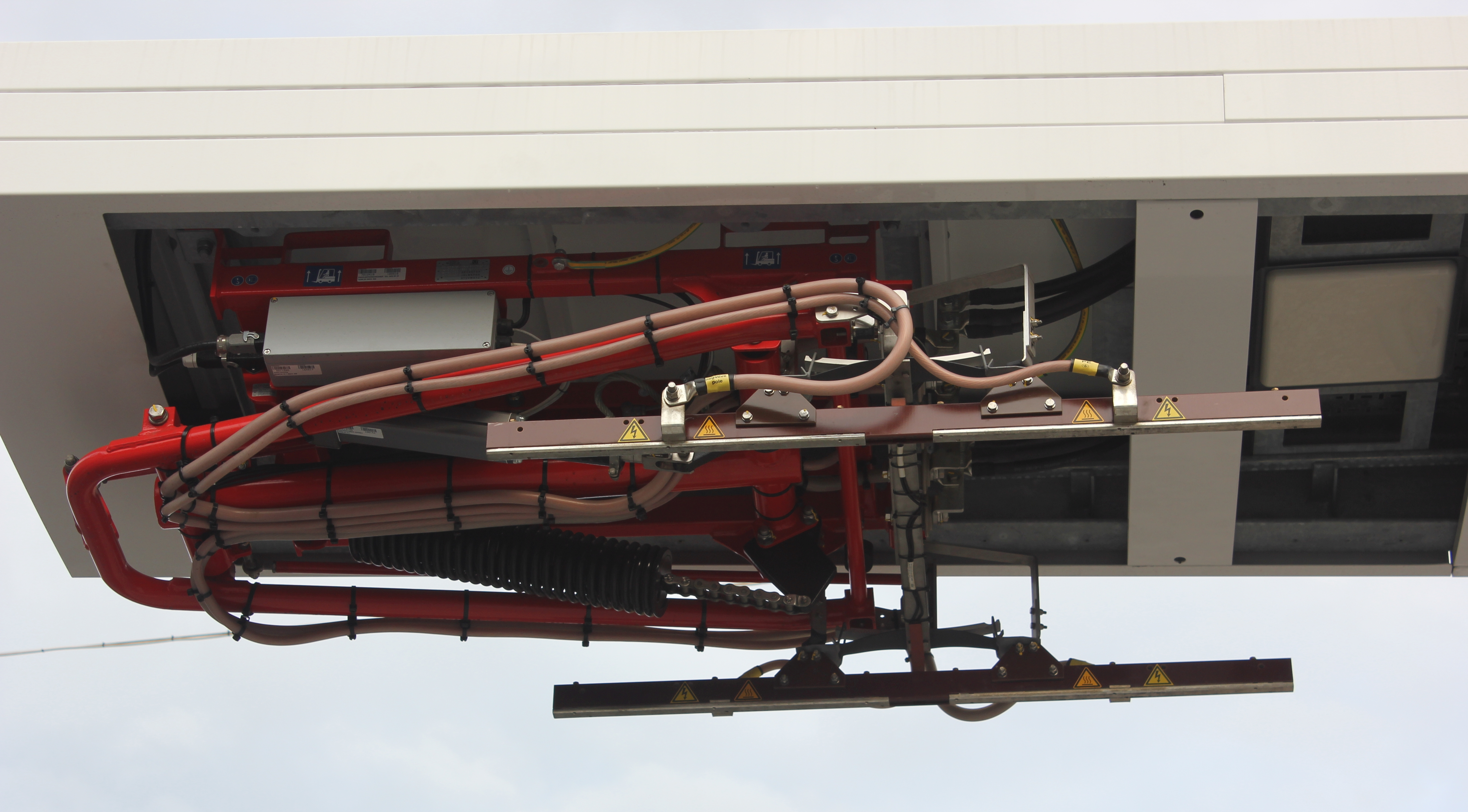
Retracted pantograph

In the cross rail ACD implementation (officially, "Infrastructure-mounted Cross Rail Connection"), a curbside charging station includes an overhead structure overhanging the street. After the bus pulls up to the charging station, contacts are lowered from the overhead charger on a pantograph and connect to rails mounted on the forward roof of the bus.

The cross rail implementation is marketed commercially as OppCharge (opportunity charging) and the OppCharge consortium, led by Volvo Buses, includes several bus and charging infrastructure manufacturers. The first OppCharge station was deployed at the end of 2016 in Bertrange, Luxembourg by ABB for hybrid buses built by Volvo. In the United States, the first OppCharge stations were deployed in 2019 by New Flyer Infrastructure Solutions as on-route chargers for the New York City Transit Authority along its M42 route.

=== Bus up (J3105-2) ===
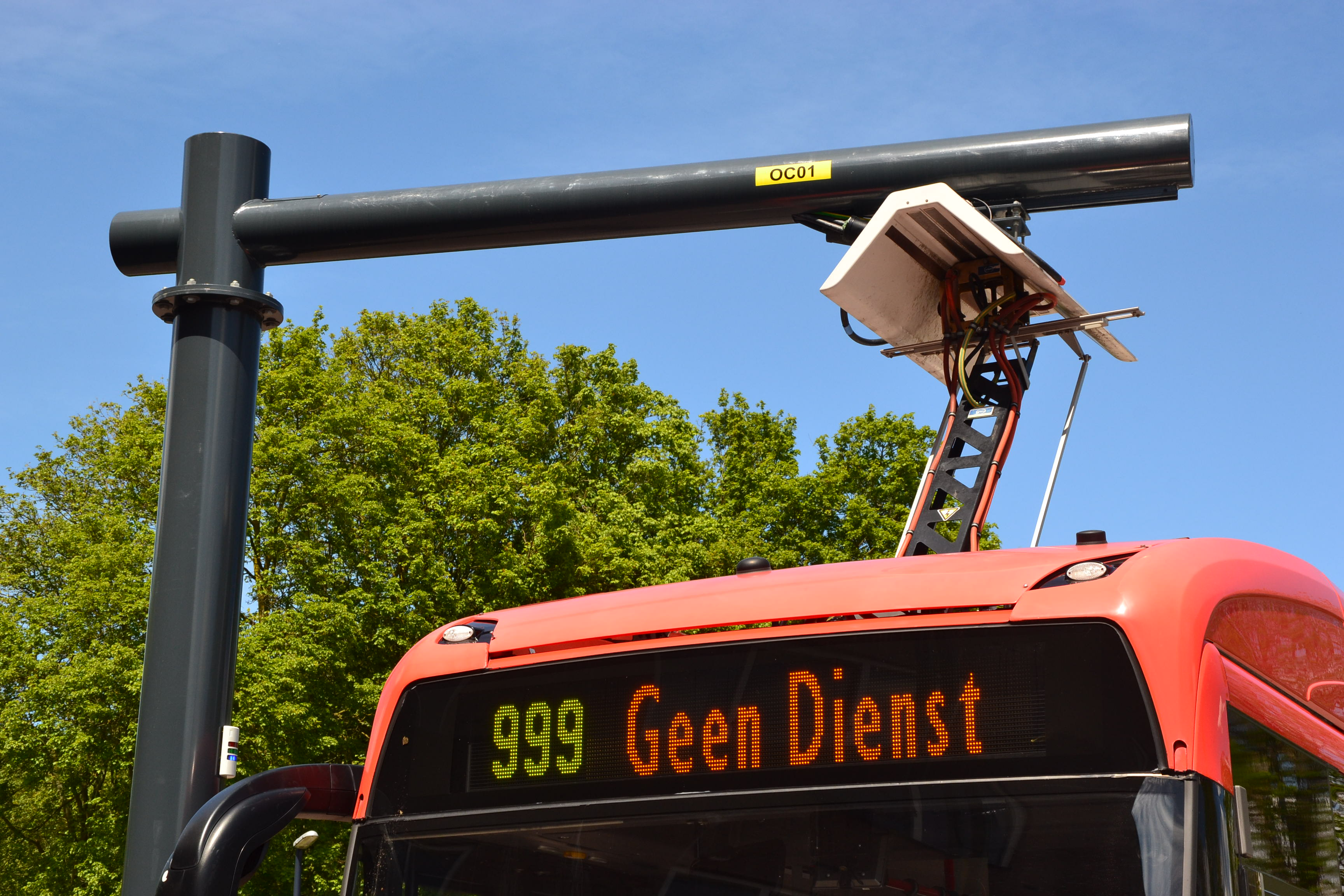
VDL Citea with a SCHUNK SLS 102 bus-up pantograph

Schematic showing pantograph head and infrastructure-mounted contact hood

The bus up ACD implementation (officially, "Vehicle-mounted Pantograph Connection") also uses an overhead charger, but the charging contacts remain fixed in place while the bus extends a pantograph up from its roof to meet the charger. The charging contacts are on the underside of a long hooded enclosure to facilitate the bus and charger contact connection.

The bus up implementation has been adopted by VDL Bus & Coach using chargers provided by Heliox, with both companies based in The Netherlands. The Amstelland-Meerlanden charging depots at Schiphol Airport were the largest electric bus charger installation in Europe when they were completed in 2018, including 23 450 kW opportunity chargers and 84 30 kW depot chargers from Heliox, servicing a fleet of 100 VDL Citea SLFA articulated buses equipped with bus-up pantographs. Heliox also introduced a dual-interface system compatible with both top-down (J3105-1) and bus-up (J3105-2) vehicles in 2018.

=== Pin and socket (J3105-3) ===
Two pin sizes for J3105-3

In the pin and socket ACD implementation (officially, "Enclosed Pin and Socket Connection"), a pin is inserted horizontally from a curbside charging station into a socket with a guiding funnel on the roof of the vehicle.

The pin and socket implementation was developed by Stäubli, who market it as the Quick Charging Connector (QCC). QCC has been implemented on a test basis at ports in Hamburg (6 charging stations and 25 automated guided vehicles [AGV]) and Singapore (3 stations and 22 AGVs). In addition, the Port of Long Beach has announced its intentions to convert an existing fleet of 33 diesel-powered tractors to battery-electric drivetrains, which will include the installation of charging stations. The quantity of charging stations, built by Tritium and fitted with the Stäubli QCC system, will be sufficient to allow all 33 tractors to be charged simultaneously. The Long Beach charger installation was completed in December 2023.

== Rejected implementation ==
A fourth ACD implementation ("Infrastructure-Mounted Blade Connection" or "Blade") was part of the preliminary development, but marketing was discontinued during development of the J3105 standard and the Blade implementation was not included in the initial issue.

=== Blade ===
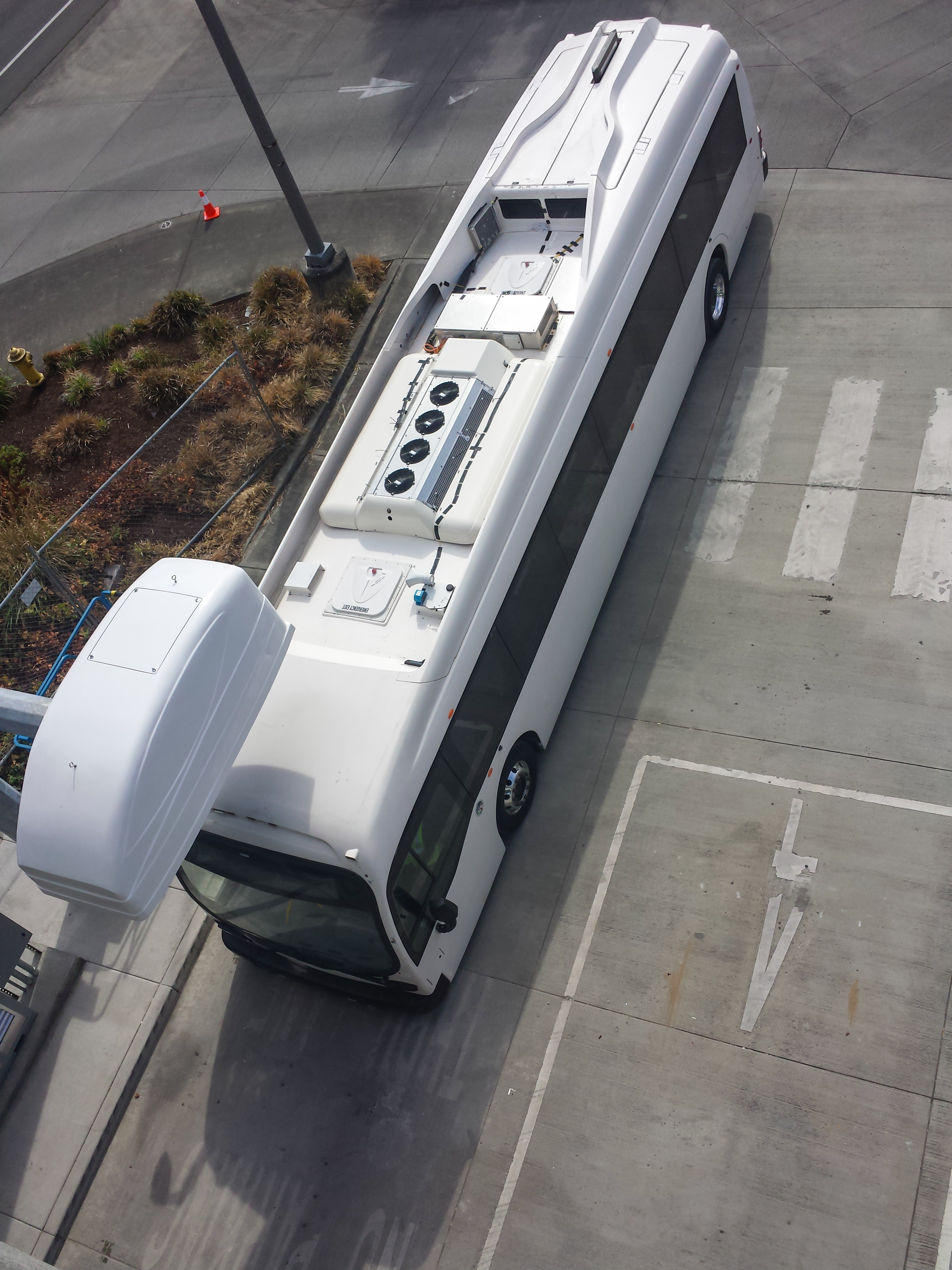
Proterra Catalyst and roof "scoop"

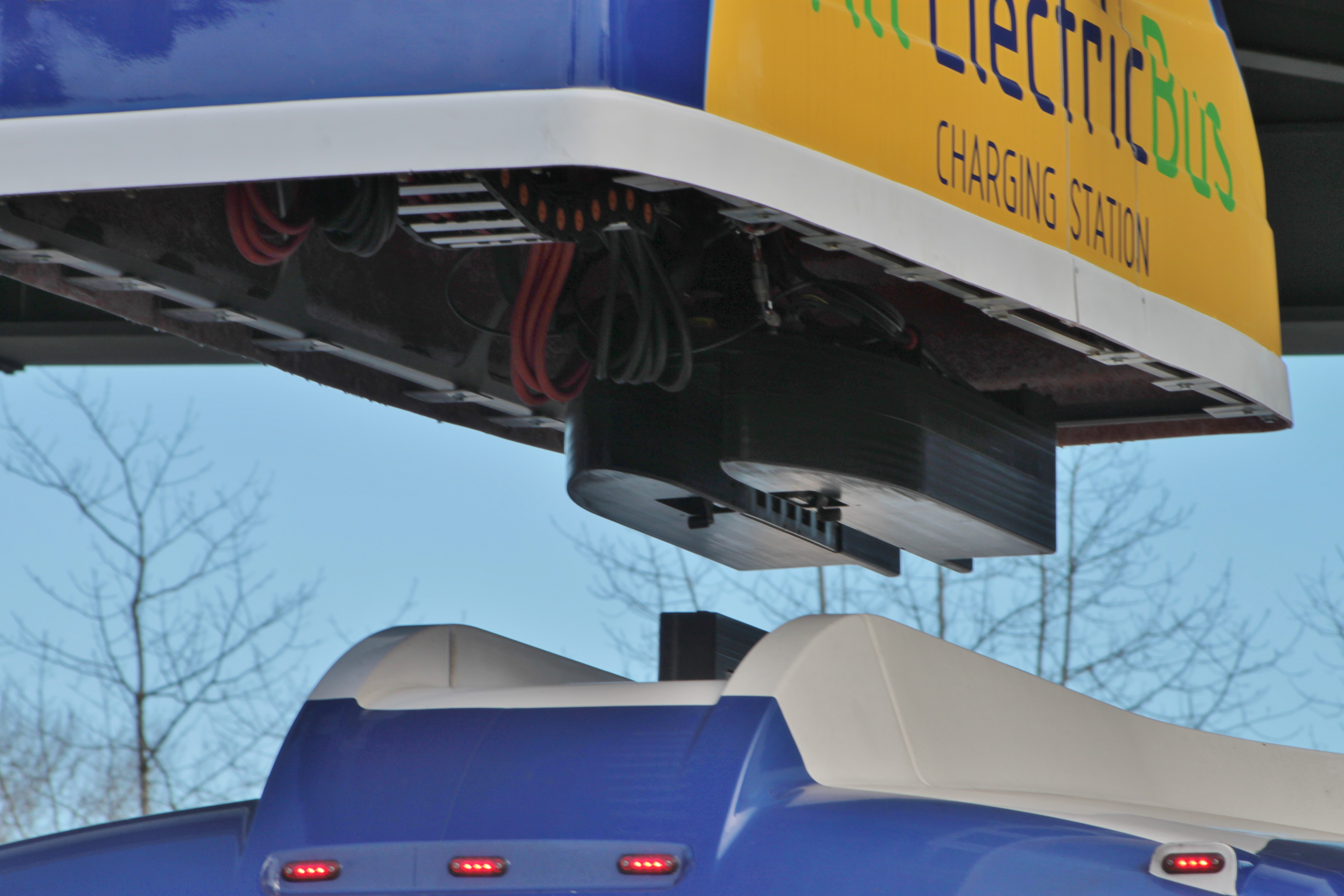
Charger shoe, positioned above "blade" contact

The blade ACD implementation ("Infrastructure-mounted Blade Connection") is similar to the cross rail implementation, as both use an overhead charging device with a passive vehicle contact. However, in the blade implementation, a funnel-like "scoop" on the roof of the bus is used to mechanically guide the charger shoe onto a "blade" charging contact at the rear roof of the bus. The blade implementation is slower to engage than the cross rail, but the docking process to mate the vehicle to the charger is more automated.

The blade implementation was developed by Proterra for its line of battery-electric buses. Proterra offered royalty-free access to its patented design starting in 2016. Despite this, the blade design was not adopted by other manufacturers and the blade implementation was eventually dropped from J3105 during development, some time after 2018. Proterra has since adopted J3105-1 (pantograph-down) or J3105-2 (pantograph-up) charging systems for newer buses.
