= Type 3 connector =

Electric vehicle charging connector in Europe

Type 3
- Type: Electric vehicle charging

Production history
- Designer: Scame / CEI CIVES
- Designed: 1999 / 2010

General specifications
- Pins: 4 or 7 (1 earth, 1–3 line phases, 1 neutral, 1–2 signalling)

Electrical
- Signal: 1‒3 phase AC
- Earth: Dedicated pin
- Max. voltage: 480 V
- Max. current: 63 A

Data
- Data signal: SAE J1772#Signaling: Resistive / Pulse-width modulation

Pinout
- Pinouts for Types 3A and 3C electric vehicle charging plugs
PP	Proximity pilot	pre-insertion signalling (Type 3C only)
CP	Control pilot	post-insertion signalling
PE	Protective earth	full-current protective earthing system
N	Neutral	single-/three-phase AC
L1	Line 1	single-/three-phase AC
L2	Line 2	three-phase AC (3C only)
L3	Line 3	three-phase AC (3C only)

The IEC 62196 Type 3 connector (often referred to as Scame for the company that designed it) is used for charging battery electric vehicles, mainly within France and Italy, as it was one of three AC plug standards described in IEC 62196-2. The Type 3 connector comes in two physical formats, Type 3A for single-phase (230V) and Type 3C for single- and three-phase (400V) alternating current (AC) power. Both have since been superseded by the Type 2 connector (aka Mennekes), the latter adopted as sole connector in 2013 by the European Union. The Type 1 connector (aka Yazaki) is the corresponding AC connector standard used in North America, Japan, and South Korea.

Type 3A and 3C connectors are derived from the popular industrial blue IEC 60309 single- and three-phase AC connectors, which come in different diameters according to maximum current, most commonly 16 A and 32 A. The battery management system on the electric vehicle negotiates the maximum current with the electric vehicle supply equipment via dedicated pins in the Type 3C connector. The Type 3 (3A/3C) connectors are generally oval in shape, with circular top and bottom edges and flat right and left edges; the maximum power carried is 24 kW. Type 3C plugs have a mechanical shutter to protect the pins from being touched inadvertently; mechanical shutter protection have since been added as an option for Type 2 connectors.

== History, overview, and peer connectors ==
In 1999, the Commissione Italiana Veicoli Elettrici Stradali (Italian electric vehicles association, CIVES) approached Scame to design an interface specifically for charging electric vehicles, which led to a system that delivered single-phase AC line voltage through what is now called a Type 3A female socket via an adaptor that plugged into a standard 230 V AC outlet. These were derived from the existing IEC 60309 standard for pin-and-socket connectors and endorsed in the provisional ENV 50275 family of IEC standards in accordance with Comitato Elettrotecnico Italiano (CEI) standard 69–6. Two versions are available: one for the CEI 23-50 (Type L) 16A socket used in Italy, and the other for the CEE 7 (Types E/F) socket used in France and Germany. In addition to the AC power contacts and protective earth, there is a single control pilot communication pin in the Type 3A interface, which verifies the continuity of the protective earth circuit. The maximum rated current and voltage are 16 A and 200–250 V, respectively. This is defined as Mode 2 charging under IEC 61851.

The Type 3C interface was developed approximately ten years later for the transmission of power at more than 3 kW; the EV Plug Alliance was formed in March 2010 to promote the use of the Type 3C connector as "a high safety plug and socket solution" in Mode 3 (3–22 kW) AC charging. The EV Plug Alliance was a bi-national organization whose founding members were Schneider Electric (France), Legrand (France), and Scame (Italy). Schneider considered the Type 3C connector to be most suited for the EVSE socket outlet / cord plug pairing, as the cord would be supplied by the EV manufacturer with a connection specific to the EV. This concept was analogous to the implementation of USB, where the computer is equipped with a universal connector (USB-A) that is physically different from the peripheral connector (USB-B, mini USB, micro USB, etc.), and it is incumbent on the peripheral supplier to include a connecting cable.

In January 2013, the IEC 62196-2 Type 2 connector was selected by the European Commission as the official AC charging plug within the European Union. It has since been adopted as the recommended connector in most countries worldwide, including New Zealand. The Type 2 connector has a maximum power output for 43 kW and can handle both single-, dual- and three-phase AC power.

The IEC 62196-2 Type 1 connector (codified under SAE J1772) is the corresponding standard for single-phase AC charging in the United States, Canada, and South Korea. J1772 has a maximum output of 19.2 kW.

== Description ==
Terminology

As specified by IEC 62196, cars are fitted with a male vehicle inlet, whilst charging stations are fitted with a female socket outlet, either directly on the outside of the charging station, or via a flexible cable with permanently attached connector on the end. A separate male-to-female cable is used to connect the vehicle using a male plug connecting to the female socket outlet of the charging station; this last connection was proposed to use the Type 3C connector, while the vehicle-to-cable connection would be made using a connector of the EV manufacturer's choice (Type 1, 2, or 3).

The Type 3C connector can be provided with a logic-controlled latching system to prevent theft of the cable. In this system, a pin is driven up from below the socket, mating with a matching cutout on the shroud of the plug. This also serves to lock the cover of the socket when not in use, making the system resistant to vandals.

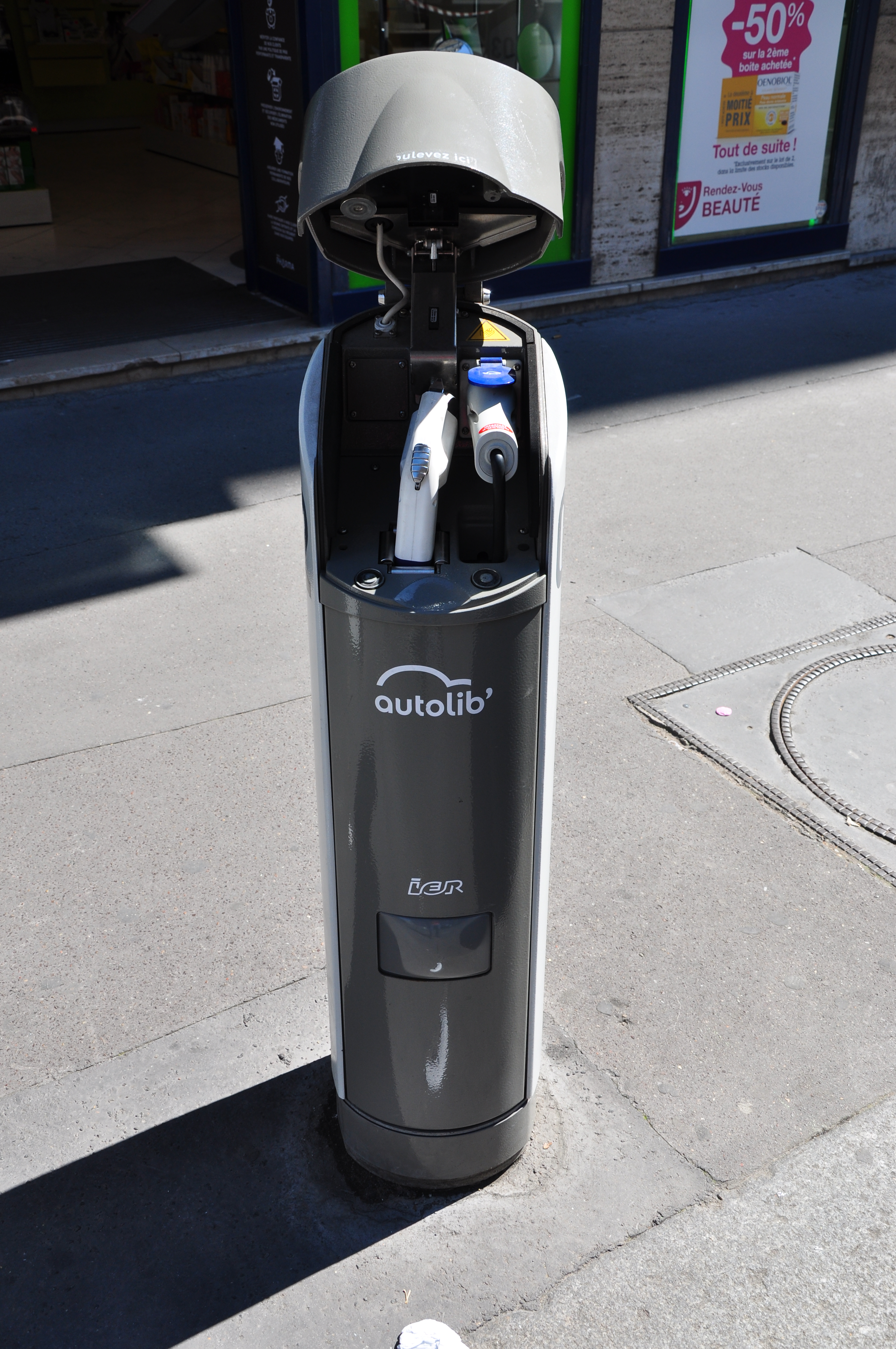
Charging station for Autolib' with the normally locked cover shown open. On the right, the EVSE socket outlet is mated to a cable plug using a Type 3C interface; a Type 1 connector on the other end of the cable is provided to mate with a matching vehicle inlet on the Bollore Bluecar.

With the adoption of de facto regional standards for AC vehicle inlet connectors (Type 1 in North America and Japan, Type 2 in Europe and the rest of the world), the Type 3C connector has been obsoleted and is not commonly encountered. Some home and public AC charging stations are "untethered", meaning they do not have permanently attached cables, so the EV owner is responsible for supplying the connecting cable. In most cases those untethered stations use a female Type 2 socket outlet. A law in France requires mechanical protection for the infrastructure interface, so there are still some (generally older) untethered charging stations in that country which are equipped with Type 3C socket outlets.

=== Pins ===
The connectors contain seven contact places: two small and five larger. The top row consists of two smaller contacts for signalling, the middle two rows each contain two AC power pins, and the bottom row, with one centred pin, is used for Earthing. Three pins are always used for the same purposes:

- Proximity pilot (PP): pre-insertion signalling
- Control pilot (CP): post-insertion signalling
- Protective earth (PE): full-current protective earthing system

Communication takes place over the CP/PP signalling pins between the charger, cable, and vehicle to ensure that the highest common denominator of voltage and current is selected. The signalling protocol is identical to that of Type 1 connectors as described in the SAE J1772 standard.

== See also ==
- IEC 62196, for information about the specification
- CHAdeMO and CCS Combo, for rapid charging.
- SAE J1772, or Type 1 connector, the equivalent AC connector used in North America, South Korea and Japan
- Type 2 connector, the superseding AC connector used in Europe
- OpenEVSE
