= Mennekes =

German manufacturer of electrical connectors

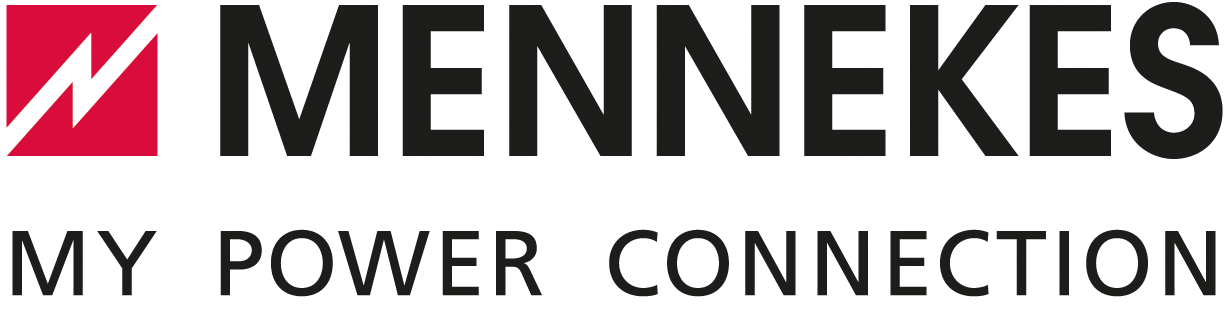
- Company type: GmbH & Co. KG
- Founded: 1935
- Founder: Aloys Mennekes
- Headquarters: Kirchhundem, North Rhine-Westphalia, Germany
- Area served: Worldwide
- Key people: Walter Mennekes, Christopher Mennekes, Christoph Epe, Volker Lazzaro, stellv. Geschäftsführer: Jürgen Bechtel, Dietmar Spurk
- Products: Industrial plugs and connectors
- Number of employees: 1200 worldwide
- Website: www.mennekes.org

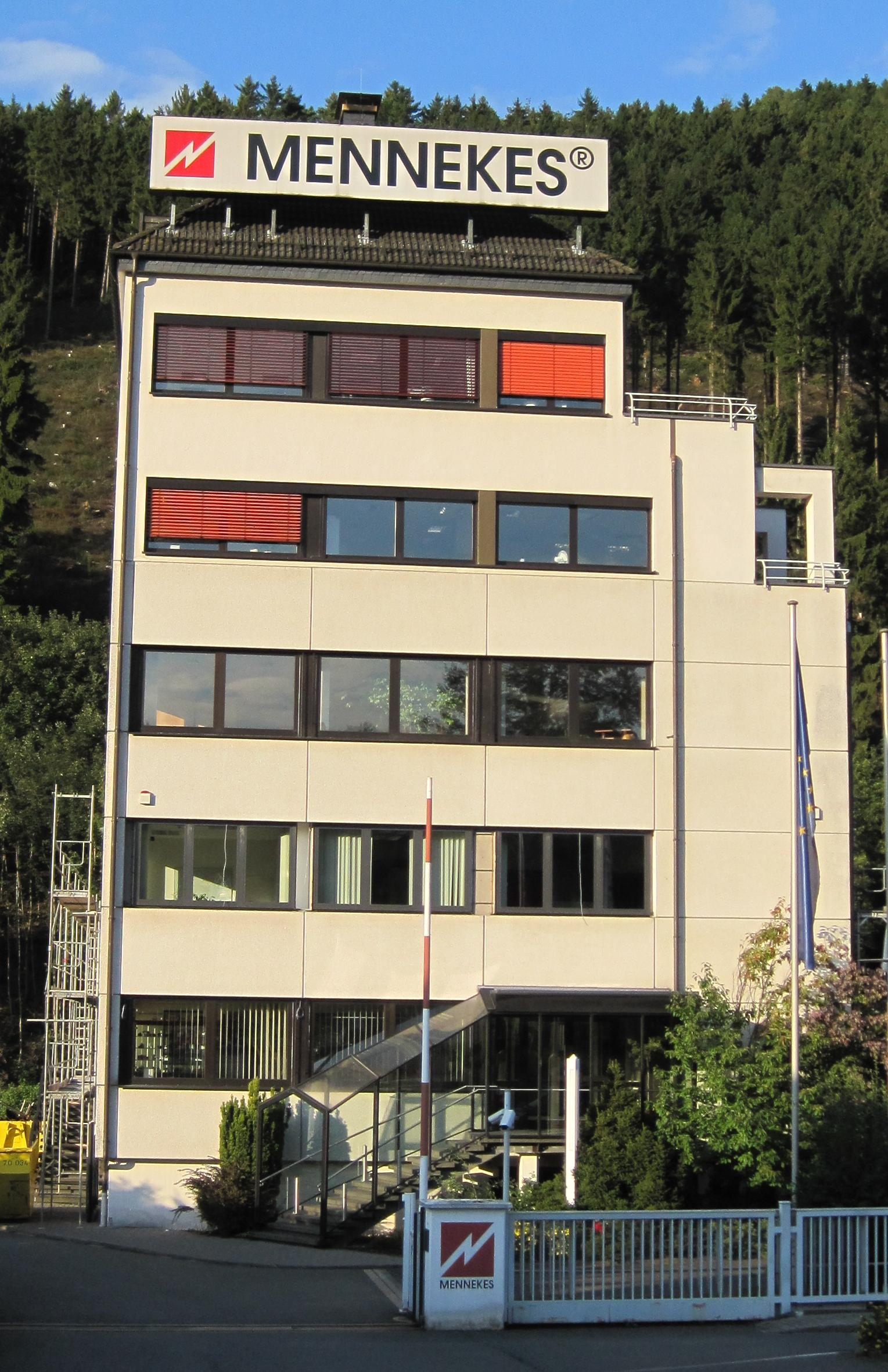
Company headquarters 2010

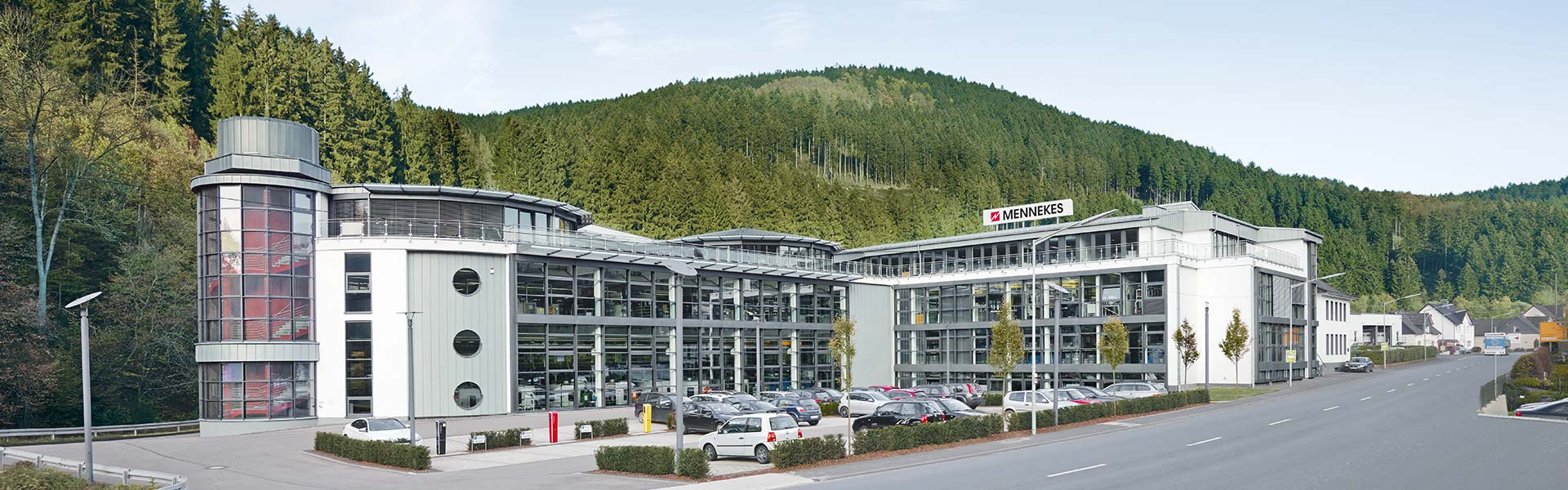
company building in Kirchhundem

Mennekes Elektrotechnik GmbH & Co. KG is a German manufacturer of industrial plugs and connectors with headquarters in Kirchhundem in the Sauerland region, Germany.

== Foundation and entry into connector production ==
Mennekes Elektrotechnik GmbH & Co. KG was founded in 1935 by an electrician Aloys Mennekes (1910-1976).

The business started as an electrician's workshop and two years later became an electrical goods store.

After the end of the Second World War, the company was involved in repairing power lines destroyed by the effects of the war.

In 1945, an electric firelighter was produced in the rented town hall, as there was also a shortage of matches at the time. The "Glühauf", which cost 9.90 Reichsmarks and was a glow spiral that could be plugged into a socket, could light cigarettes and strips of paper. The "Glühauf" was MENNEKES' first patent, and the company soon had 39 employees.

A short time later, the company started to produce plugs for special applications. In 1947, the company built its own factory building on the present factory premises, and in 1948 the entire company moved to the new plant.

In the beginning the plugs were made of aluminum, but from 1960 the plugs and connectors were also made of plastic. In 1957 another factory building was added to the company premises, and in 1973 the company moved into a new, two-story production building. When the company founder Aloys Mennekes died, the company already employed 250 people. Already one year before, his sons Dieter (* 1940; † 2020) and Walter (* 1947) had taken over the company as successors. In 1990, MENNEKES was registered as a trademark. One year later, the company took over Technoplast in Neudorf, which has been fully part of the Mennekes Group since 1995 as MENNEKES Elektrotechnik Sachsen GmbH. From 1992, Walter Mennekes was the sole owner and shareholder of MENNEKES Elektrotechnik GmbH & Co. KG.

== Entry into E-vehicle market ==
In 2008, MENNEKES entered the electric vehicles business. A year later, the company became known to a wider public in connection with the charging plug for electric vehicles, which the company had designed according to the specifications of RWE and Daimler. MENNEKES already had experience with charging plugs based on the IEC 60309 standard (three-phase connector), which was expanded to include additional signal contacts as the "CEEplus" connector. The new connector type, which became known as the "MENNEKES Type 2 connector", was published by the VDE under the VDE-AR-E 2623-2-2 standard. Two years later, it was incorporated into the following version of the international IEC 62196 standard as "Type 2". Since the designation "MENNEKES connector" is ambiguous, press releases on the charging plug always refer to the "MENNEKES Type 2 connector." In a statement, the ACEA (Association of European Automobile Manufacturers) recommended the "Type 2" connector as the uniform charging plug, since "Type 1" (originally SAE J1772) does not allow three-phase charging and "Type 3" offers no advantages. Since 2014, the "MENNEKES connector" for electric vehicles has been the standard for all of Europe by EU law. In 2011, the electric vehicle business was transferred to the subsidiary MENNEKES Stecker GmbH & Co. KG, including the opening of an eMobility showroom and a training center at the EUREF Campus Berlin.

Mennekes responded to the expansion of production in 2009 by adding 2,800 square meters of production space at its headquarters in Kirchhundem, and a new office building with 2,000 square meters of floor space was added in 2017. In 2012, a fire in an office building caused damage worth millions. Welschen Ennest was expanded into a second main location from 2013. Initially, a new logistics center was moved into there, and five years later a new injection molding hall, a high-bay warehouse and an office building were built at a cost of 40 million euros. In Neudorf, a new production hall and also a high-bay warehouse have been built since 2008. In 2011, Christopher Mennekes, who is the son of Walter Mennekes, joined the company as a managing partner.

The company has a global presence with subsidiaries and representation in more than 90 countries and employs 1,200 people worldwide (two thirds of which are in Germany). The product range comprises standardised plugs and sockets in over 15,000 different variants and designs as well as all fields of the e-vehicle business from vehicle inlets and charging cables to complete charging stations.

== See also ==
- IEC 62196-2 Type 2 connector, for charging electric cars, mainly within Europe; often referred to as "mennekes"
