= SAE J3068 =

Electric vehicle charging standard

- SAE International Recommended Practice, Electric Vehicle Power Transfer System Using a Three-Phase Capable Coupler
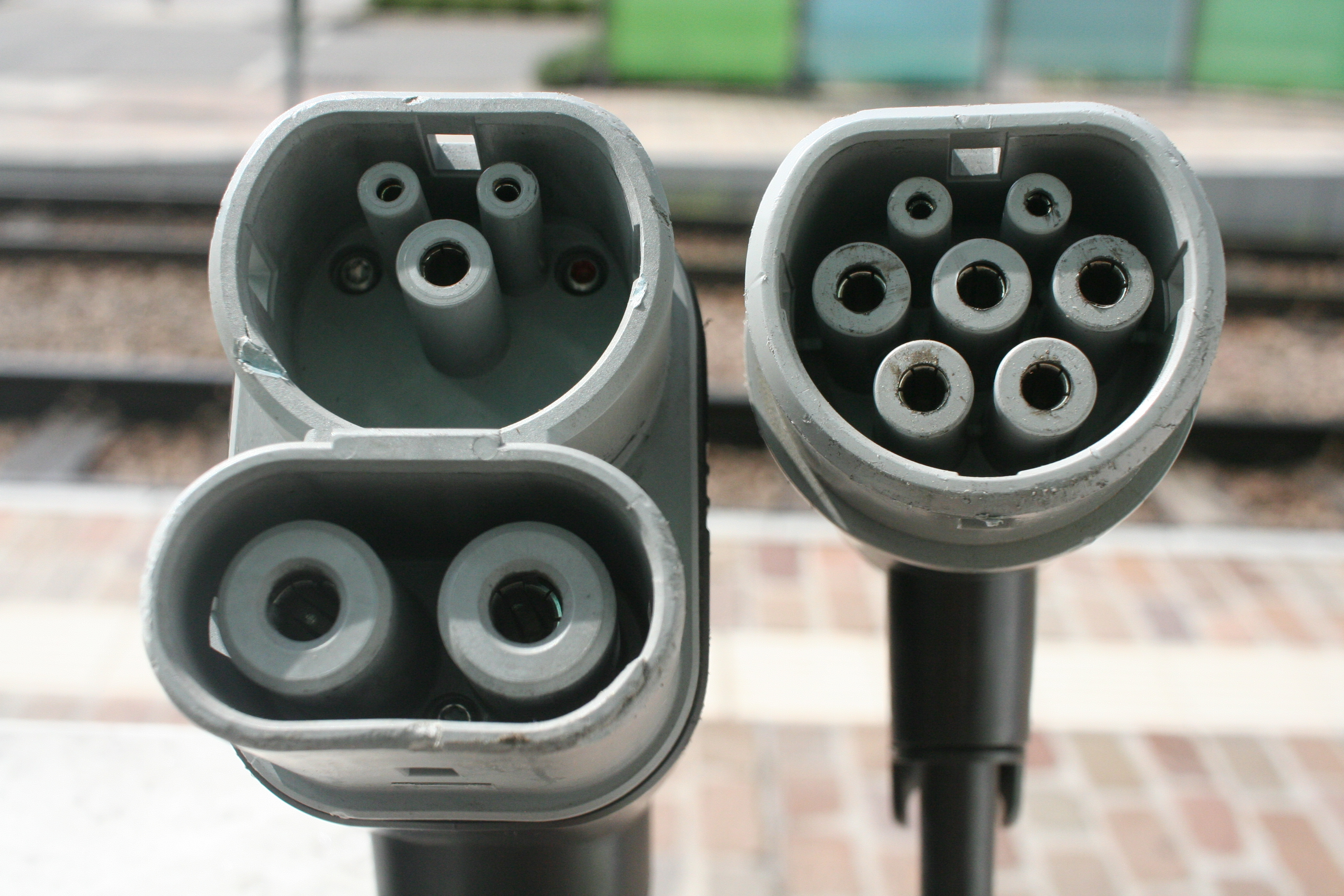
- SAE J3068 DC connector (left) termed "J3068 DC_{8} No AC" and SAE J3068 AC connector (right) termed "J3068 AC_{6}"
- Abbreviation: J3068
- Status: Published
- First published: April 24, 2018
- Latest version: Sep 29, 2024
- Committee: Truck and Bus Electrical Systems Committee
- Website: J3068_202409

SAE J3068 "Electric Vehicle Power Transfer System Using a Three-Phase Capable Coupler" is a North American recommended practice published and maintained by SAE International. J3068 defines electrical connectors and a control protocol for charging electric vehicles. It has the formal title "SAE International Recommended Practice J3068". J3068 defines a system for conductive power transfer to an electric vehicle using a coupler capable of transferring single-phase and three-phase AC power as well as DC power, and defines a digital communication protocol for control. J3068 also specifies requirements for the vehicle inlet, supply equipment connector, mating housings and contacts.

== History ==
Initial discussions in the Electric Power Research Institute's Infrastructure Working Council meetings regarding issues related to three-phase charging in North America led to the development of J3068. There was a lack of non-proprietary, UL listed equipment that could be legally used in the United States. Some large electric vehicles were being charged without using ground fault protection, and without connectors that automatically de-energize when disconnected from the vehicle.

Therefore, SAE authorized a new task force to develop a standard that focused on heavy and medium duty applications, and more generally any vehicle charging at commercial and industrial locations or other places where 3φ power (three-phase) is available and preferred. Early within the development of the standard, it was decided that the J3068 connector and inlet would expand upon Europe's IEC 62196 type 2 connector also known as the Mennekes connector.

== North American application ==
J3068 states that it aims to cover three-phase equipment which meets applicable North American listing standards.

The core standards for Electric Vehicle Supply Equipment in North America are tri-national standards for Mexico, Canada, and the United States. See CANENA. They are essentially equivalent documents with different names in each country.

Standard	USA	Canada	Mexico
AC EVSE	ANSI/UL 2594	CAN/CSA C22.2 No. 280	NMX-J-677-ANCE
Cordset/cables	ANSI/UL 2251	CAN/CSA C22.2 No. 282	NMX-J-678-ANCE
Safety	ANSI/UL 2231	CAN/CSA C22.2 No. 281	NMX-J-668-ANCE

Type 2 connector socket

The J3068 connector is mechanically identical to the Type 2 connector, because it makes direct references to IEC 62196-2 and -3. Additionally, SAE J3068 supports voltage ratings which align with North American grid voltages and EVSE standards.

Given that a 480Y/277 VAC three-phase wye-connected four-wire supply is a common configuration supplied by utilities at commercial locations – under SAE J3400 and SAE J3068 the implied higher rating is taken; thus allowing single-phase charging at 277 VAC nominal for North American application. Also, SAE J3400 electric vehicles in North America are required to support power transfer under PWM-CP at 277 VAC.

Under SAE J3400 and SAE J3068 EVSE cannot use PWM-CP controls when nominal system voltages exceed 480Y/277 VAC (single-phase 277 VAC). digital communication (e.g. LIN-CP) shall be used when these voltage limits are exceeded (e.g. 600Y/347 VAC – chiefly Canadian).

Specifications	J3068 AC_{6}	J3068 DC_{8}	J3068 AC_{6}DC_{8}
Voltage	Nominal VAC: 208/120Y 480/277Y 600/347Y	Maximum VDC: 1000	See AC_{6} and DC_{8}
Dimensions EV Inlet	IEC 62196-2 Sheet 2-IIf	IEC 62196-3 Sheet 3-IVa	IEC 62196-3 Sheet 3-IVa
Dimensions EV Connector	IEC 62196-2 Sheet 2-IIe	IEC 62196-3 Sheet 3-IVc	N/A

== Digital communication for AC charging (LIN-CP) ==
Second Edition electrical equivalent circuit for connection of LIN nodes to the control pilot circuit with improved PWM compatibility.

Basic AC charging is defined in SAE J1772 and IEC 61851-1 Annex A with an analog control pilot, and is used with a variety of single-phase AC grid voltages lower than 250 VAC. LIN-CP (Local Interconnect Network on the Control Pilot) was originally specified in IEC 61851-1 Annex D in Edition 3. Unlike PLC over Control Pilot (ISO 15118-2), LIN CP is designed to be a low-cost digital upgrade for the analog PWM controls.

The control protocol is a variation of LIN which retains the analog voltage level signaling from SAE J1772. The positive level of the LIN signal waveform can change from 12 volts to 9 or 6 volts (known as State A, State B, and State C in J1772). An earlier version of this LIN-based control protocol was published in Annex D of IEC 61851 edition 3. Major contributors to the development of this protocol include ABB in Sweden, the University of Delaware, Vattenfall Sweden, Mack Trucks/Volvo Trucks North America and others.

The description of the control protocol in the 2018 edition is written from the point of view of a developer using a commercial LIN development package with API support for LIN functionality (which is familiar to embedded controller programming teams in the automotive industry). The behavior of the EV and EVSE are described separately in terms of the signals they can see on the API. The details of how the LIN signals are sent between the EV and EVSE are assumed to be handled by commercial LIN software.

IEC 61851-1:2017 Annex D does not presume that a commercial LIN development package is used to implement the standard. It leaves the decision how to implement the standard to the developer. Differences in logic and nomenclature between J3068 and 61851-1 Annex D are detailed in J3068 (2018) Appendix F.

LIN-CP is similar to the approach used by Tesla based on J2411 (Single-wire CAN), but maintains the CP voltage levels from analog PWM to be compatible with existing EVSE safety models.

LIN transceivers used for J3068 must have an extended supply range. For example, the TI SN65HVDA100-Q1 operates from 5V to 27V. The extended voltage range is required because the LIN transceiver must operate when the Control Pilot is at 6V level (similar to "State C" in J1772).

The 2022 edition of SAE J3068 recommends a slightly different Pilot circuit from the one defined in SAE J1772 to improve compatibility with PWM signaling.

LIN-CP protocol versions
Protocol Version	Function	Additional info
1	AC - Baseline	Initial version published in IEC 61851-1 Annex D (Edition 3 - 2017) (deprecation planned when 61851-1 Edition 4 is published which will be aligned with LIN-CP Version 2)
2	AC - Baseline	Commercially deployed version published in SAE J3068
3	AC - J3068/1	Additional ID fields as published in SAE J3068/1
240-251	Proprietary / experimental	Add to this list if you made a version
252	AC - J3068/2	Additional ID, V2G and mode fields as published in SAE J3068/2
253	AC - Advanced	University of Delaware (V2G, ID, Scheduled departure)

== Compatibility ==
Connection Type	≤ 63 / 70A AND ≤ 480 / 277 V	> 63 / 70A † OR > 480 / 277 V
Case A - Plug attached to EV	LIN-CP / PWM-CP	LIN-CP
Case B - Carry-along EV cable	LIN-CP / PWM-CP	LIN-CP with Cable Node
Case C - Connector Attached to EVSE	LIN-CP / PWM-CP	LIN-CP*
*Case C with non-current-coded connector (SAE J3400/J1772) can signal up to 80A with PWM-CP † Power transfer using LIN-CP can exceed the current-coded limit of 63/70A: 1. If Case B, then a LIN-CP Cable Node with a higher current rating must be present 2. Verified the LIN-CP connection type implies that no adapters are present

SAE J3068 has additional requirements on the coupler proximity circuit (aka vehicles with Type 2 inlets in North America) that allow them to be interoperable SAE J3400 and SAE J1772 EVSE for both AC and DC power transfer which monitor proximity. Also, SAE J3068 has additional requirements on the infrastructure proximity circuit (aka socket-outlets EVSE in North America) that allow them to support 48 A carry-along cable assemblies. Both side of the proximity circuit can optionally support 12V power-over-prox (see SAE 3068/2).

SAE J3068, references SAE J3400 for DC power transfer with the appropriate adjustments for the coupler proximity circuit.

Depending on the topology of the vehicle on-board charger, it may be possible to charge from a J1772 EVSE using an adapter. While adapters are not ideal, manufacturer specific adapters might be useful and are allowed in some countries according to IEC. Such an adapter should be rated for 80 amperes, as there is no practical way to signal the adapter's current rating.

== Deployment example ==
On 7 November 2018, Greenlots announced a project to provide charging infrastructure for all electric Volvo Trucks in Southern California. "According to Greenlots, the project will be one of the first in North America to demonstrate a new heavy-duty vehicle charging standard, SAE J3068, in real-world applications."

== Equipment availability ==
Rema USA has ANSI/UL 2251 (USA) and CAN/CSA C22.2 No. 282 (Canada) listed AC_{6} 63A 480VAC three-phase cordsets (52.3 kW), and two DC_{8} 1000VDC cordsets at 125A and 200A. See Underwriters Laboratories listing number E338388.

Nuvve offers three-phase AC EVSE certified to UL and European standards with support for up to 480/277 VAC at 120 amperes with SAE J3068 and IEC 61851-1 Annex D compliance, in addition to J1772 and Annex A support at lower voltages. See Maryland Electrical Testing Labs listing number E114798.

== Reference implementations and examples ==
Developers at the University of Delaware's Transport Electrification Center have posted a reference implementation at GitHub SAE J3068 reference implementation which includes hardware and software.

An alternative LDF may be needed for LIN stacks that don't support the same signal appearing in multiple frames. See the Transport Electrification Center Blog for a link.

== Proprietary protocols in use ==
A proprietary version is in use in "behind the fence" applications in North America using protocol version 253. The intention is to deprecate this version when the increased functionality is added to SAE J3068 in an updated edition of the recommended practice in the near future.
