= IEC 61851 =

International standards for vehicle charging technology

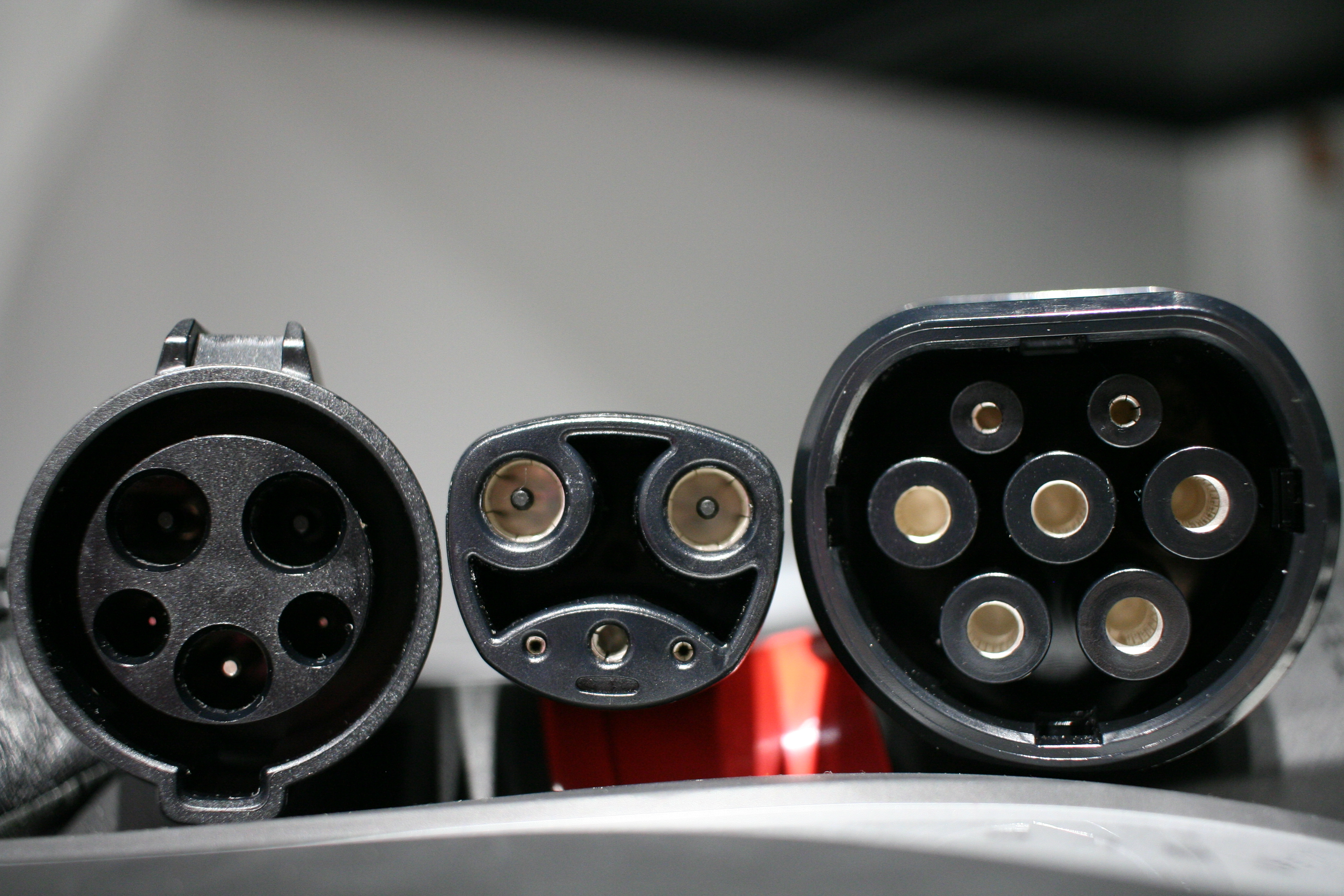
Left to right: IEC Type 1, NACS, IEC Type 2

IEC 61851 is an international standard for electric vehicle conductive charging systems, parts of which are currently still under development^{(written 2017)}. IEC 61851 is one of the International Electrotechnical Commission's group of standards for electric road vehicles and electric industrial trucks and is the responsibility of IEC Technical Committee 69 (TC69).

== Standard documents ==
IEC 61851 consists of the following parts, detailed in separate IEC 61851 standard documents:

- IEC 61851-1: General requirements
- IEC 61851-21-1: Electric vehicle on-board charger EMC requirements for conductive connection to AC/DC supply
- IEC 61851-21-2: Electric vehicle requirements for conductive connection to an AC/DC supply – EMC requirements for off board electric vehicle charging systems
- IEC 61851-23: DC electric vehicle charging station
- IEC 61851-24: Digital communication between a DC EV charging station and an electric vehicle for control of DC charging
- IEC 61851-25: DC EV supply equipment where protection relies on electrical separation

== IEC 61851-1 ==
IEC 61851-1 defines four modes of charging:

IEC 61851-1 charging modes
Mode	Diagram	Limits			Supply & Interface	RCD Protection	Applications	Notes
Mode	Diagram	Phases	Current	Voltage	Supply & Interface	RCD Protection	Applications	Notes
1	EV connected directly to AC grid	1φ	16A	250V	AC, non-dedicated	No	electric bikes, scooters, trickle-charging	Direct connection of vehicle to conventional electrical outlets. Not allowed in the US, Israel, and United Kingdom; prohibited for public charging by Italy; restricted in Switzerland, Denmark, Norway.
1	EV connected directly to AC grid	3φ	16A	480V	AC, non-dedicated	No	electric bikes, scooters, trickle-charging	Direct connection of vehicle to conventional electrical outlets. Not allowed in the US, Israel, and United Kingdom; prohibited for public charging by Italy; restricted in Switzerland, Denmark, Norway.
2	EV connected to AC grid through cable incorporating RCD protection	1φ	32A	250V	AC, non-dedicated	Yes	"slow AC"	Requires control box between vehicle and electrical outlet incorporating RCD protection. Prohibited for public charging by Italy; restricted in US, Canada, Switzerland, Denmark, France, Germany and Norway. Typical portable / "home" charger.
2	EV connected to AC grid through cable incorporating RCD protection	3φ	32A	480V	AC, non-dedicated	Yes	"slow AC"	Requires control box between vehicle and electrical outlet incorporating RCD protection. Prohibited for public charging by Italy; restricted in US, Canada, Switzerland, Denmark, France, Germany and Norway. Typical portable / "home" charger.
3	EVSE connected to AC grid, supplies EV using tethered cable or socket-outlet with bidirectional communication	1φ	70A	250V	AC, dedicated (IEC 62196-2)	Yes	"slow and quick AC"	EVSE permanently connected to electrical grid; includes RCD protection and bidirectional (EVSE/EV) communication. Typical public AC charger installation. Tethered (cable permanently attached) & untethered (dedicated socket outlet only) configurations.
3	EVSE connected to AC grid, supplies EV using tethered cable or socket-outlet with bidirectional communication	3φ	63A	480V	AC, dedicated (IEC 62196-2)	Yes	"slow and quick AC"	EVSE permanently connected to electrical grid; includes RCD protection and bidirectional (EVSE/EV) communication. Typical public AC charger installation. Tethered (cable permanently attached) & untethered (dedicated socket outlet only) configurations.
4	EVSE rectifies AC grid & supplies DC power to EV using tethered cable with bidirectional communication	–	500A	1000V	DC, dedicated (IEC 62196-3)	Yes	"fast DC"	Current conversion handled by EVSE, not EV. The transformer and other equipment is placed in the EVSE, which allows much more heavy and powerful equipment.

== See also ==
- ISO 15118 – Standard defining a vehicle to grid (V2G) communication interface for bi-directional charging/discharging of electric vehicles
- IEC 61850 – Communication protocols for intelligent electronic devices at electrical substations
- IEC 61851 – Standard for electric vehicle conductive charging systems
- IEC 62196 – A series of international standards that define requirements and tests for plugs, socket-outlets, vehicle connectors and vehicle inlets
- IEC 63110 – Protocol for the management of electric vehicles charging and discharging infrastructure
- OpenEVSE
