= IEC 62196 =

International standards for electric vehicle charging

- Plugs, socket-outlets, vehicle connectors and vehicle inlets – Conductive charging of electric vehicles
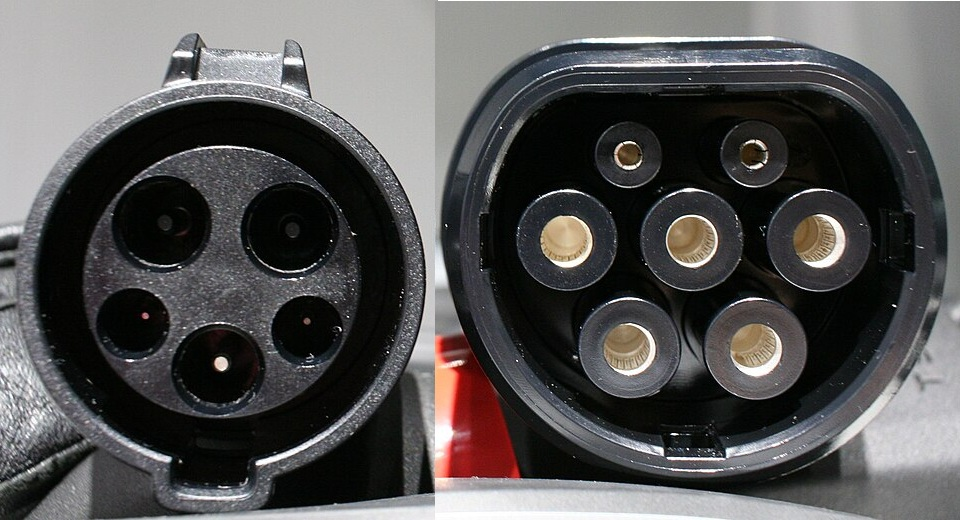
- IEC Type 1/SAE J1772 inlet; IEC Type 2 connector outlet
- Abbreviation: IEC 62196
- Status: Published
- First published: 2003
- Organization: International Electrotechnical Commission
- Committee: TC23 SC23H

IEC 62196 Plugs, socket-outlets, vehicle connectors and vehicle inlets – Conductive charging of electric vehicles is a series of international standards that define requirements and tests for plugs, socket-outlets, vehicle connectors and vehicle inlets for the conductive charging of electric vehicles. It is published by the International Electrotechnical Commission (IEC) and is developed and maintained by its technical committee TC23 subcommittee SC23H (which prepares standards for Plugs, Socket-outlets and Couplers for industrial and similar applications, and for Electric Vehicles).

Accessories (that is plugs, socket-outlets, vehicle connectors and vehicle inlets as defined by IEC 62196) together with their cable assemblies provide physical connections between electric vehicle supply equipment (abbreviated EVSE, as defined by IEC 61851 or by IEC 62752) and electric vehicles (abbreviated EV, as defined by ISO 17409 or by ISO 18246).

Accessories have contacts that conduct electricity, and according to ISO62196 most connectors also provide additional contacts that support specific functions that are relevant to charging of electric vehicles, e.g. to ensure that power is not supplied unless a vehicle is connected and is immobilized.

Several parts of this series of standards have been published as European Standards (EN 62196 series), which in turn have been published as British Standards (BS EN 62196 series). Similar requirements are contained in SAE J1772, which is widely applied in the United States.

== Published standards ==
The following parts of the IEC 62196 series have been published:

- Part 1: General requirements
- Part 2: Dimensional compatibility requirements for A.C. pin and contact-tube accessories
- Part 3: Dimensional compatibility and interchangeability requirements for D.C. and A.C./D.C. pin and contact-tube vehicle couplers
- Part 3-1: Vehicle connector, vehicle inlet and cable assembly for DC charging intended to be used with a thermal management system
- Specification 62196-4: Dimensional compatibility and interchangeability requirements for DC pin and contact-tube accessories for Class II or Class III applications
- Part 6: Dimensional compatibility and interchangeability requirements for DC pin and contact-tube vehicle couplers for DC EV supply equipment where protection relies on electrical separation

Specification 62196-7: Vehicle adapter is in development (publication expected in 2026), as well as other specifications and updates (as of December 2025).

== IEC 62196-1 General requirements ==
IEC 62196-1 General requirements
- Plugs, socket-outlets, vehicle connectors and vehicle inlets – Conductive charging of electric vehicles – Part 1: General requirements
- Abbreviation: IEC 62196-1
- Status: Published
- First published: 2003
- Latest version: Edition 5; 2025
- Website: IEC 62196-1:2025

=== Contents ===
IEC 62196-1 provides a general description of the interface between an electric vehicle and a charging station as well as general mechanical and electrical requirements and tests for plugs, socket-outlets, vehicle connectors and vehicle inlets that are intended to be used for EV charging. It does not describe specific designs, which can be found in the other parts of the standard.

=== History ===
The first edition, IEC 62196-1:2003, was published in 2003. This edition was applicable to plugs, socket-outlets, connectors, inlets and cable assemblies for AC and DC charging of electric vehicles with rated voltages and rated currents as follows:

- AC: up to 690 V, up to 250 A
- DC: up to 600 V, up to 400 A.

Typical connectors and inlets that were built according to this edition of the standard used spring-loaded butt contacts and were made by Avcon and Maréchal Electric.

The second edition, IEC 62196-1:2011, was published in 2011. One significant change was the increase of the maximum voltage of connectors, inlets and cable assemblies for DC charging to 1500 V. The development of this edition was coordinated with the first edition of IEC 62196-2, which describes several configurations of pin-and-sleeve contacts for AC charging, the combined a.c./d.c.charging was under consideration.

The third edition, IEC 62196-1:2014, was published in 2014. One significant addition was the general description of a “combined interface” as used by the Combined Charging System. The development of this edition was coordinated with the first edition of IEC 62196-3, which describes connectors and inlets for DC charging.

The fourth edition, IEC 62196-1:2022, was published in 2022. This edition includes additional requirements for contact materials and plating, makes changes to the temperature rise test to include additional points of measurement, and includes additional tests for accessories to address thermal stresses and stability, mechanical wear and abuse, and exposure to contaminants. Rated AC and DC voltages and currents in IEC 62196-1:2022 are as follows:

- AC: up to 690 V, up to 250 A
- DC: up to 1,500 V, up to 800 A

This edition do deletion of references to universal AC and DC interfaces.

The fifth edition, IEC 62196-1:2025, was published in 2025. This edition adds new tests for latching and retaining of connectors and type 4 accessories.

== IEC 62196-2 Dimensions for AC accessories ==
IEC 62196-2 Dimensional compatibility requirements for AC pin and contact-tube accessories
- Plugs, socket-outlets, vehicle connectors and vehicle inlets – Conductive charging of electric vehicles – Part 2: Dimensional compatibility requirements for AC pin and contact-tube accessories
- Abbreviation: IEC 62196-2
- Status: Published
- First published: 2011
- Latest version: Edition 4; 2025
- Website: IEC 62196-2:2025

=== Contents ===
IEC 62196-2 extends IEC 62196-1 and describes specific designs of plugs, socket-outlets, vehicle connectors and vehicle inlets that are intended to be used for AC charging of electric vehicles in the modes 1, 2 and 3 as described by IEC 61851-1. The specific designs are grouped into three configurations.

The designs are described with sufficient detail to allow compatibility between products of different manufacturers.

=== Configurations ===
IEC 62196-2 describes three different designs (Types 1, 2, and 3) with different configurations and dimensions which support:

- single-phase charging at up to 16 A, without control pilot contact,
- single-phase charging at up to 32 A,
- three-phase charging at up to 63 A (only for Types 2 and 3).

Terminology

Each design includes male and female connectors, generally arranged as

1. a (female) socket-outlet on the electric vehicle supply equipment (EVSE, charger)
2. a (male) plug on one end of the cable
3. a (female) connector on the opposite end of the cable
4. a (male) vehicle inlet on the EV itself

The EVSE may be a tethered station, in which case the cable is permanently attached and only the latter two interfaces are relevant. In Europe, untethered stations may be offered, where the cable is detachable and all four interfaces are present.

Connector designs listed in IEC 62196-2 (Note: For pin definitions, see page for each specific standard)
Power supply	United States	European Union	Japan	China
1-phase AC (62196.2)	Type 1 (SAE J1772)	Type 2 (Note: In India, "low-power" vehicles with traction battery voltages less than 100 V DC use the Bharat EV Charger standards. For AC charging (230 V, 15 A / 10 kW maximum), the Bharat EV Charger AC-001 standard endorses the IEC 60309 three-pin connector.) (Note: For high-power vehicles, India has largely adopted global standards: IEC 62196 Type 2 connector for AC charging (≥22 kW) and CHAdeMO.) (DE, UK) Type 3 (IT, FR; now deprecated)	Type 1 (SAE J1772)	Type 2 (GB/T 20234.2) (Note: Although GB/T 20234.2 is physically capable of supporting three-phase power, the standard does not include its use.)
3-phase AC (62196.2)	Type 2 (SAE J3068)	Type 2 (DE, UK) Type 3 (IT, FR; now deprecated)	—N/a	

==== Type 1 ====
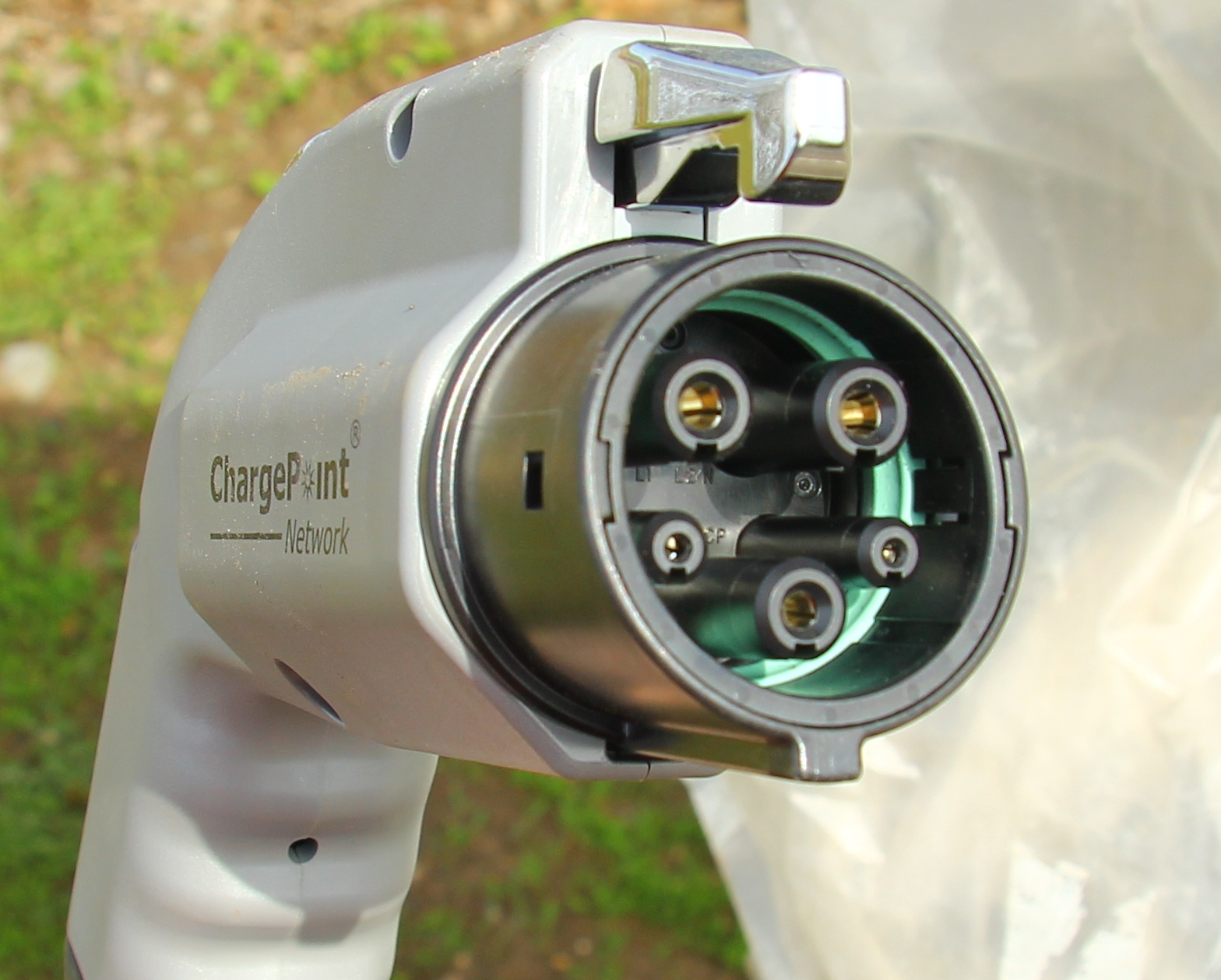
Type 1 connector

This configuration consists of a vehicle coupler (vehicle connector and vehicle inlet).

Because the original design was made by the manufacturer Yazaki and first published in SAE J1772, it is colloquially known as the Yazaki connector or J1772 connector.

It features a round housing, which has a notch on the vehicle inlet for proper orientation, with five pin-and-sleeve contacts for two AC conductors, a protective conductor and two signal pins that are used for the control pilot function (according to IEC 61851-1 Annex A) and for proximity detection (using an auxiliary switch and no current coding, according to IEC 61851-1 Annex B). When inserted into the vehicle inlet, the connector is held in place by a mechanical latch, which is part of the connector.

IEC 62196-2 describes this configuration with an operating current up to 32 A, allowing a maximum current of 80 A only for applications in the US, where this higher operating current is also described by SAE J1772.

This configuration only supports single-phase charging. It is widely used in the US and Japan.

==== Type 2 ====
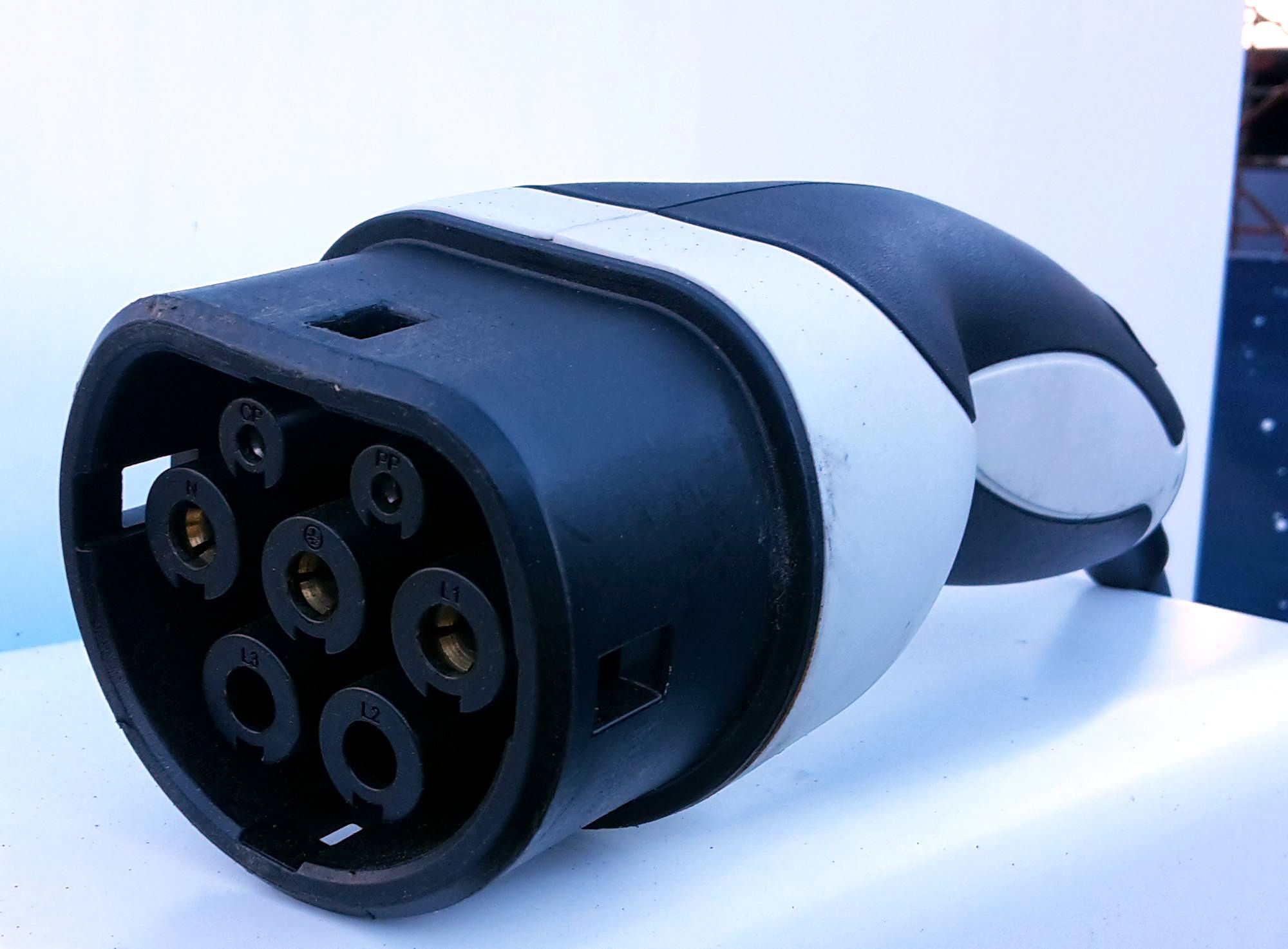
Type 2 connector

This configuration consists of a plug and socket-outlet that support charging in mode 3, as described in IEC 61851-1, and a vehicle coupler, consisting of vehicle connector and vehicle inlet, that supports charging in modes 2 and 3. (Within this configuration, IEC 62196-2 additionally describes a connector for mode 1 and an inlet for all modes 1, 2 and 3, but these are not used.)

Because the original design was made by the manufacturer Mennekes, it is colloquially known as the Mennekes connector. It features a round housing, which is flattened on one side for proper orientation, with up to seven pin-and-sleeve contacts for up to four AC conductors, a protective conductor and two signal pins that are used for the control pilot function (according to IEC 61851-1 Annex A) and for simultaneous proximity detection and current coding (according to IEC 61851-1 Annex B). By design, the contacts can not be touched by the standardized test finger. Since the second edition of the standard, additional touch protection of the contacts can optionally be provided by shutters. When inserted into the inlet, the connector is held in place by the locking mechanism, which is attached to the inlet. The same concept is used by the socket-outlet to hold the plug in place.

IEC 62196-2 describes this configuration with operating currents up to 63 A, allowing a maximum current of 70 A only for single-phase applications.

Configuration type 2 differs from the first proposal by Mennekes that was presented in the German standard VDE-AR-E 2623-2-2 that was published in 2009 and withdrawn in 2012, when the German version of IEC 62196-2:2011 became available. Pins and sleeves were swapped between the inlet and the connector and the dimensions were slightly changed.

Another similar but different design is described by the Chinese standard GB/T 20234.2.

Within the European Union, regulation requires all public AC charging stations to be equipped with a type 2 socket-outlet or a type 2 connector.

==== Type 3 ====
Types 3A and 3C (Scame), viewed facing socket-outlet.

This configuration generally consists of a socket-outlet and plug.

Because the original design was made by the manufacturer Scame, it is colloquially known as the Scame connector. Typically, Type 3C is encountered on charging infrastructure (but not vehicles) because it provides a shutter to prevent touching the contacts, which is a requirement for publicly-accessible EVSE in 12 European countries.

It features an oval housing, which is flattened on two sides for proper orientation, with up to seven pin-and-sleeve contacts for up to four AC conductors, a protective earth conductor and one or two signal pins that are used for simultaneous proximity detection and current coding (according to IEC 61851-1 Annex B) and, where present, for the control pilot function (according to IEC 61851-1 Annex A). When inserted into the vehicle inlet, a lug on the connector is held in place by the cap covering the vehicle inlet, similar to the mating of IP44 IEC 60309 connectors. The same concept is used by the socket-outlet to hold the plug in place.

=== History ===
The first edition, IEC 62196-2:2011, was published in 2011.

The second edition, IEC 62196-2:2016, was published in 2016. The most significant change was the introduction of optional shutters for configuration type 2.

The third edition, IEC 62196-2:2022, was published in 2022. Interchangeability requirements were removed from the title and the standard was aligned with new editions of IEC 62196-1, IEC 62196-3 and IEC 61851-1.

The fourth edition, IEC 62196-2:2025, was published in 2025. Tests for latching devices were added and standards sheets were corrected.

== IEC 62196-3 Dimensions for DC and AC/DC vehicle couplers ==
IEC 62196-3 Dimensional compatibility requirements for DC and AC/DC pin and contact-tube vehicle couplers
- Plugs, socket-outlets, vehicle connectors and vehicle inlets – Conductive charging of electric vehicles – Part 3: Dimensional compatibility requirements for DC and AC/DC pin and contact-tube vehicle couplers
- Abbreviation: IEC 62196-3
- Status: Published
- First published: 2014
- Latest version: Edition 2; 2022
- Website: IEC 62196-3:2022

=== Contents ===
IEC 62196-3 extends IEC 62196-1 and describes specific designs of vehicle connectors and vehicle inlets that are intended to be used for DC charging of electric vehicles in mode 4 as described by IEC 61851-1 and IEC 61851-23. The specific designs are grouped into several configurations.

The designs are described with sufficient detail to allow compatibility between products of different manufacturers.

The first edition, IEC 62196-3:2014, was published in 2014. The second edition, IEC 62196-3:2022, was published in 2024.

=== Configurations ===
All configurations consist of a connector and inlet.

Connector designs listed in IEC 62196-3 (Note: For pin definitions, see page for each specific standard)
Power supply	United States	European Union	Japan	China
DC (62196.3)	EE (CCS Combo 1)	FF (CCS Combo 2) (Note: For high-power vehicles, India has largely adopted global standards: CHAdeMO and CCS Combo 2 for DC charging (≥50 kW).)	AA (CHAdeMO)	BB (GB/T 20234.3) (Note: In India, "low-power" vehicles with traction battery voltages less than 100 V DC use the Bharat EV Charger standards. For DC charging (48–72+ V, 200 A / 15 kW maximum), the corresponding Bharat EV Charger DC-001 standard endorses the same connector used in China (GB/T 20234.3).)
DC (62196.3)	EE (CCS Combo 1)	FF (CCS Combo 2)	ChaoJi (planned)	

==== AA ====
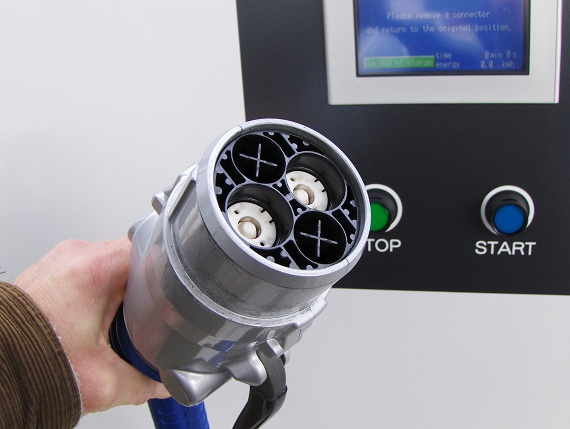
CHAdeMO connector

Configuration AA is colloquially known as the “Chademo connector”, because it was designed and is used by the Chademo organisation. The original design was first published in the Japanese standard JEVS G105-1993.

This coupler is intended to be used with DC charging stations that implement System A according to IEC 61851-23 and CAN-communication according to IEC 61851-24 Annex A. It is mostly used in Japan and in countries with many electric vehicles that were designed in Japan.

==== BB ====
Configuration BB is intended to be used with DC charging stations that implement System B according to IEC 61851-23 and CAN communication according to IEC 61851-24 Annex B. It is mostly used in China, where the same technical solution is described by the standard GB/T 20234.3.

==== CC DD ====
Configuration CC and DD are reserved for future use. They were discussed during the work on the document but were not specified in the published version of IEC 62196-3:2014.

==== EE ====
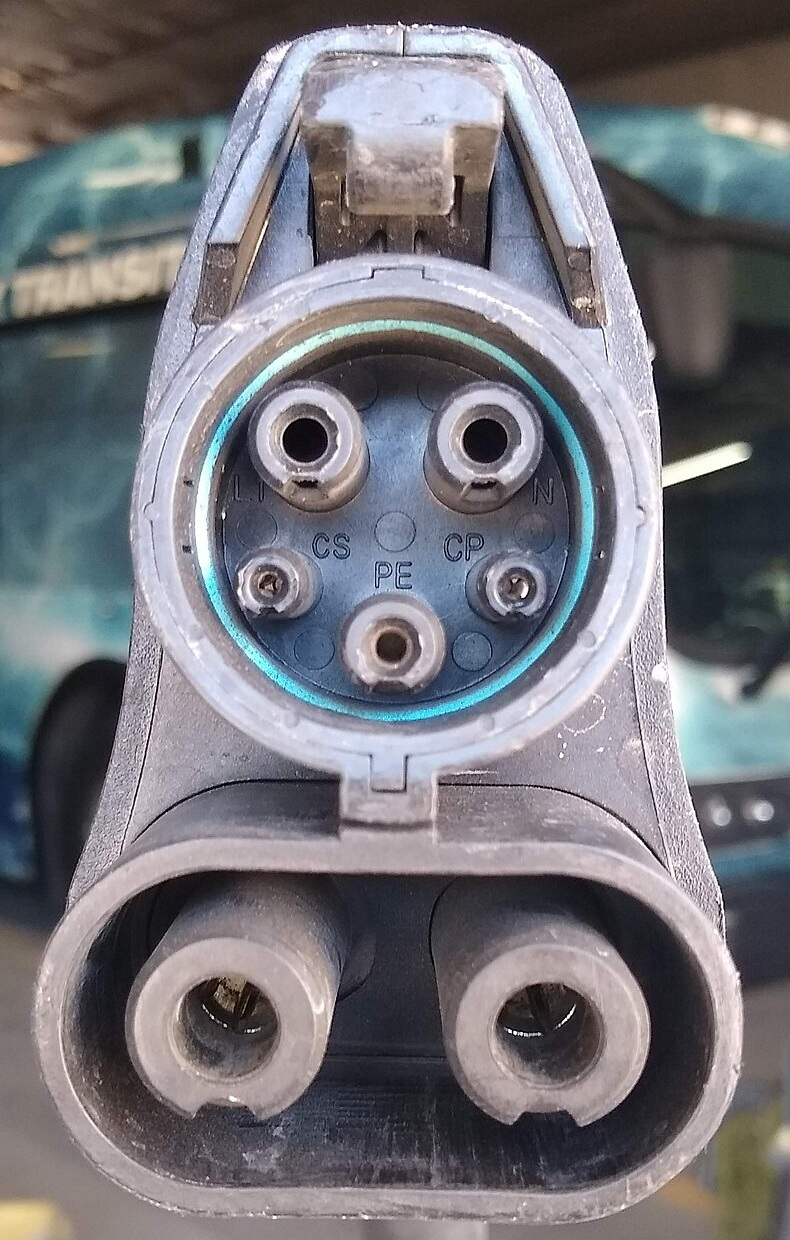
A CCS1 / Combo1 connector

Configuration EE is colloquially known as the “CCS1 connector” or “Combo1 connector”, because it is used within the Combined Charging System and extends the Type 1 coupler.

Configuration EE is intended to be used with DC charging stations that implement System C according to IEC 61851-23 and PLC communication according to IEC 61851-24 Annex C and ISO 15118-3. It is mostly used in North America, where the same technical solution is described by the standard SAE J1772.

==== FF ====
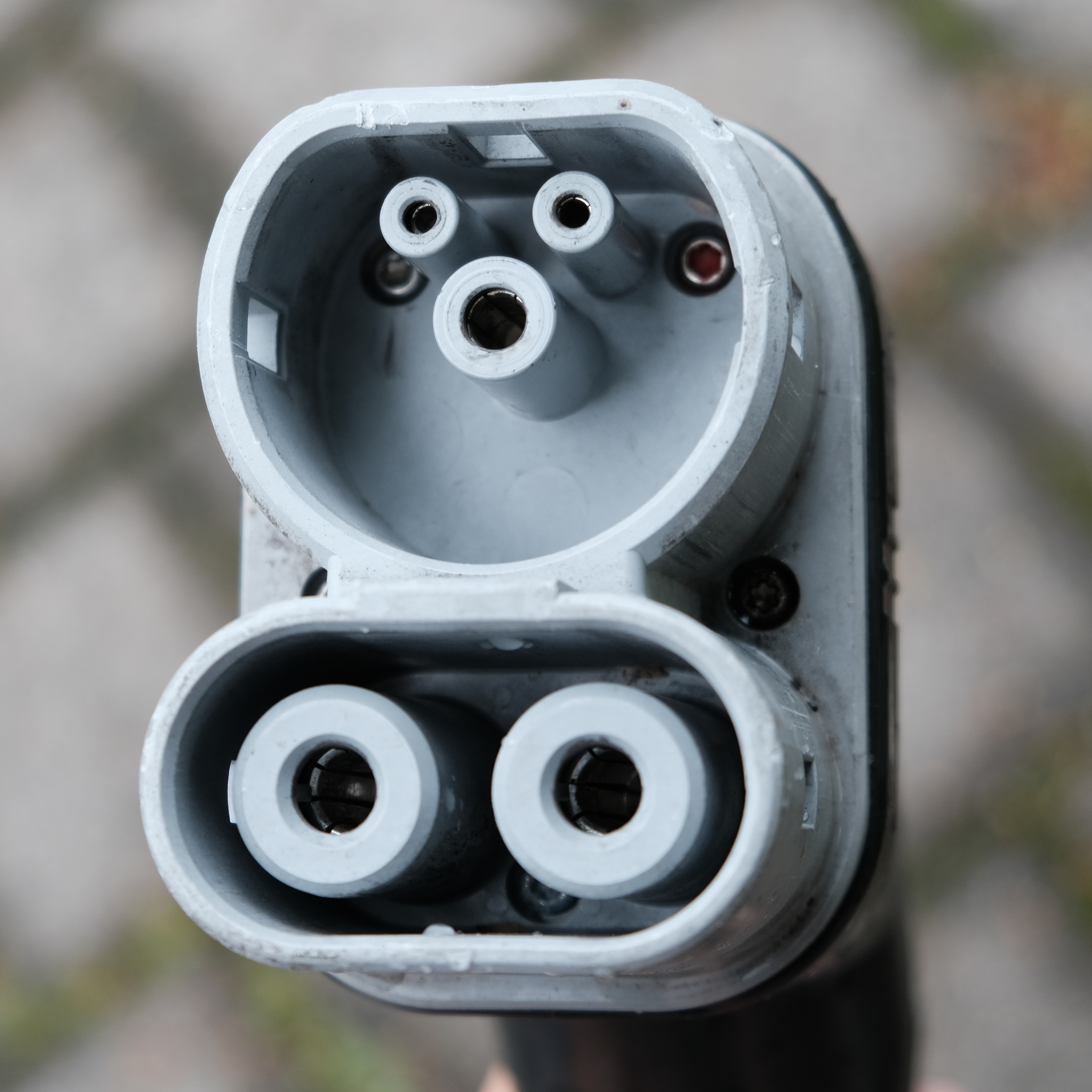
CCS2 / Combo2 connector

Configuration FF is colloquially known as the “CCS2 connector” or “Combo2 connector”, because it is used within the Combined Charging System and extends the Type 2 coupler.

Configuration FF is intended to be used with DC charging stations that implement System C according to IEC 61851-23 and PLC communication according to IEC 61851-24 Annex C and ISO 15118-3.

It is a global standard. Within the European Union, regulation requires all public DC charging stations to be equipped with a configuration FF connector. It is also used in India.

== IEC TS 62196-3-1 DC charging with thermal management ==
This IEC technical specification describes how vehicle connectors and vehicle inlets according to IEC 62196-3 can be used with cables with quite small conductor cross section if thermal management is applied. Thermal management uses thermal sensors and adjusts the current to limit the temperature rise of the cable assembly.

The first edition, IEC TS 62196-3-1:2020 was published in 2020.

== IEC TS 62196-4 Dimensions for DC accessories for Class II or Class III applications ==
IEC 62196-4 Dimensional compatibility and interchangeability requirements for DC pin and contact-tube accessories for Class II or Class III applications
- Plugs, socket-outlets, vehicle connectors and vehicle inlets – Conductive charging of electric vehicles – Part 4: Dimensional compatibility and interchangeability requirements for DC pin and contact-tube accessories for Class II or Class III applications
- Abbreviation: IEC 62196-4
- Status: Published
- First published: 2022
- Latest version: Edition 1; 2022
- Website: IEC 62196-4:2022

This IEC technical specification extends IEC 62196-1 and describes specific designs of plugs, socket-outlets, vehicle connectors and vehicle inlets that are intended to be used for DC charging through circuits specified in IEC 61851–3 series, where protection against electric shock is ensured by double or reinforced insulation. The maximum operating voltage is 120 V at a nominal current of up to 60 A. One typical application is light electric vehicles. This standard was published in 2022.

== IEC 62196-6 Dimensions for DC couplers for EVSE where protection relies on electrical separation ==
IEC 62196-6 Dimensional compatibility requirements for DC pin and contact-tube vehicle couplers intended to be used for DC EV supply equipment where protection relies on electrical separation
- Plugs, socket-outlets, vehicle connectors and vehicle inlets – Conductive charging of electric vehicles – Part 6: Dimensional compatibility requirements for DC pin and contact-tube vehicle couplers intended to be used for DC EV supply equipment where protection relies on electrical separation
- Abbreviation: IEC 62196-6
- Status: Published
- First published: 2022
- Latest version: Edition 1; 2022
- Website: IEC 62196-6:2022

This standard extends IEC 62196-1 and describes specific designs of plugs, socket-outlets, vehicle connectors and vehicle inlets that are intended to be used for DC charging through circuits that will be specified in IEC 61851-25, where protection against electric shock is ensured by electrical separation. The maximum operating voltage is 120 V at a nominal current of up to 100 A. One typical application will be light electric vehicles. This standard was published in 2022.

== See also ==
- SAE J1772 - the compatible North American standard for Type 1 connectors
- SAE J3068 - the compatible North American standard for Type 2 connectors
- CHAdeMO
- Mennekes Type 2 connector
