= OpenEVSE =

OpenEVSE ("Electric Vehicle Supply Equipment") is an Arduino-based charging station created by Christopher Howell and Sam C. Lin. The charger is composed of open-source software and hardware that can be made by individuals.

The project started in February 2011, with an experiment aimed at generating the SAE J1772 pilot signal on an Arduino-compatible ATmega328 8-Bit AVR MCU. Subsequent experiments continued until a prototype J1772-compatible controller was created.
