= Type 2 connector =

Electric vehicle charging connector in Europe

IEC 62196-2 Type 2
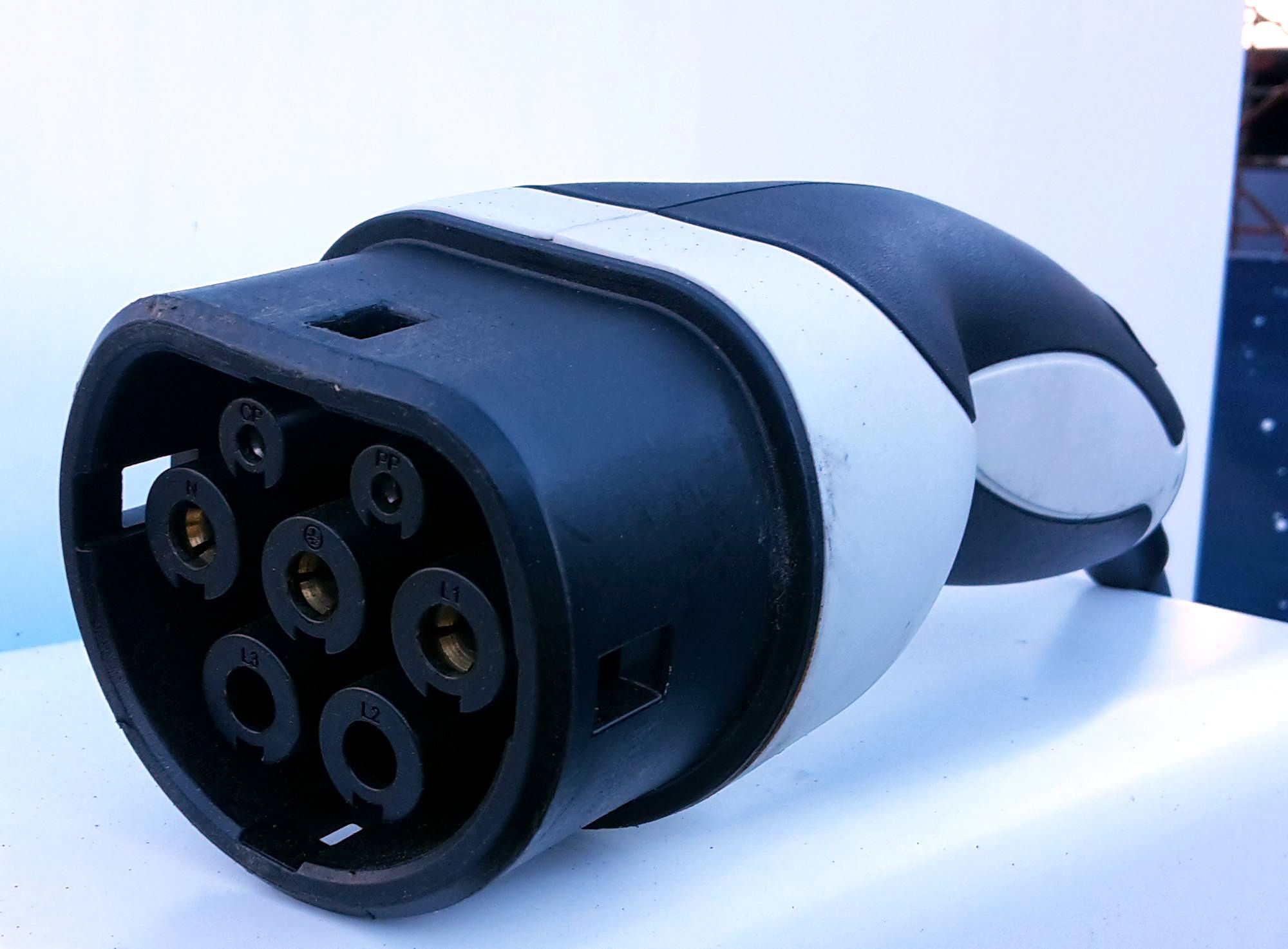
- Type 2 charger.
- Type: Electric vehicle charging

Production history
- Designer: Mennekes
- Designed: 2009
- Produced: 2013

General specifications
- Length: 200 millimetres (7.9 in)
- Diameter: 70 millimetres (2.8 in)
- Width: 70 millimetres (2.8 in)
- Height: 63 millimetres (2.5 in)
- Pins: 7 (1 earth, 3 line phases, 1 neutral, 2 signalling)
- Connector: VDE-AR-E 2623-2-2

Electrical
- Signal: DC, 1‒3 phase AC
- Earth: Dedicated pin
- Max. voltage: 480 V
- Max. current: 300 A

Data
- Data signal: SAE J1772#Signaling: Resistive / Pulse-width modulation

Pinout
- Pinout for Type 2 plug
PP	Proximity pilot	pre-insertion signalling
CP	Control pilot	post-insertion signalling
PE	Protective earth	full-current protective earthing system—6-millimetre (0.24 in) diameter
N	Neutral	single-/three-phase AC / DC-mid
L1	Line 1	single-/three-phase AC / DC-mid
L2	Line 2	three-phase AC / DC-mid
L3	Line 3	three-phase AC / DC-mid

The IEC 62196-2 Type 2 connector (sometimes, mainly in the US, improperly referred to as Mennekes for the German company that was involved in the development) is used for charging electric vehicles using AC power, mainly within Europe, Australia, NZ and many other countries outside North America. The Type 2 connector was adopted as the EU standard in 2013, with full compliance required by 2025. The connector was chosen by the EU to promote electric mobility and ensure interoperability between different vehicles and charging stations. The Type 2 connector is equipped with seven pin connectors, which are used for communication between the vehicle and charger using the J1772 signaling protocol, and for either single or 3-phase AC power with a maximum voltage of 400 V and 63 A, thereby delivering up to 43 kW of power.

A later, modified version of the Type 2 connector which includes two additional DC current pins at the base to allow for high-power (up to 350 kW) DC fast charging, is known as a Combined Charging System (CCS) Combo 2 plug, and has also been adopted as an EU standard.

The connector is circular in shape, with a flattened top edge; the original design specification carried an output electric power of 3–50 kW for charging battery electric vehicles using single-phase (230V) or three-phase (400V) alternating current (AC), with a typical maximum of 32 A 7.2 kW using single-phase AC and 22 kW with three-phase AC in common practice. The plugs have openings on the sides that allow both the car and the charger to lock the plug automatically to prevent unwanted interruption of charging or theft of the cable.

As modified by Tesla for its European Supercharger network (up to Version 2), it is capable of outputting 150 kW using direct current (DC) via two pins each, with a switch inside the Tesla Model S or X car selecting the required mode. Since 2019, Tesla has adopted the CCS2 connector on their Version 3 Superchargers (outputting 250 kW), including a second cable for CCS support on Version 2 Superchargers, on all European models of the Model 3 and Y, with a hardware upgrade and adapter for pre-2019 Model S and X vehicles, and since 2022 on Model S and X as the new connector.

== History, overview, and peer connectors ==
The Type 2 connector system was originally proposed by Mennekes in 2009. The system was later tested and standardized by the German Association of the Automotive Industry (VDA) as VDE-AR-E 2623-2-2, and subsequently recommended by the European Automobile Manufacturers Association (ACEA) in 2011. In January 2013, the IEC 62196 Type 2 connector was selected by the European Commission as official AC charging plug within the European Union. It has since been adopted as the recommended connector in most countries worldwide, including New Zealand. When passing AC, the maximum power of the Mennekes connector is 43 kW. The IEC 62196 Type 1 connector (codified under SAE J1772) is the corresponding standard for single-phase AC charging in the United States, Canada, and South Korea. J1772 has a maximum output of 19.2 kW.

In North America, the same Type 2 physical connector is used for three-phase AC charging under the SAE J3068 standard, which uses Local Interconnect Network (LIN) for control signaling based on IEC 61851-1 Edition 3 Annex D. J3068 increases the maximum output to 166 kW using three-phase AC.

The same physical connector is also used in China under the Guobiao standard GB/T 20234.2-2015 for AC-charging, with gender differences for the vehicle and electric vehicle supply equipment. GB/T 20234-2 specifies cables with Type 2-style male connectors on both ends, and a female inlet on vehicles—the opposite gender to the rest of the world, and with different control signaling.

The Combined Charging System Combo 2 "fast charging" connector uses the signaling and protective earth pins of the Type 2 connector and adds two direct current (DC) pins for rapid charging, with DC power supplied at rates up to approximately 350 kW.

== Description ==
Regional variations in IEC 62196-2 Type 2 AC implementation
Terminology
Region / Standard	Socket outlet	Connecting cable		Vehicle inlet	Electrical		
Region / Standard	Socket outlet	Plug	Connector	Vehicle inlet	Phase (φ)	Current	Voltage
EU / IEC 62196 Type 2	Female	Male	Female	Male	1φ	70 A	480 V
EU / IEC 62196 Type 2	Female	Male	Female	Male	3φ	63 A	480 V
US / SAE J3068 AC_{6}	Permanently connected		Female	Male	3φ	100, 120, 160 A	208, 480, 600 V
China / GB/T 20234.2	Female	Male	Male	Female	1φ (3φ reserved)	16, 32 A	250/400 V

As specified by IEC 62196, cars are fitted with a standardized male vehicle inlet, whilst charging stations are fitted with a female socket outlet, either directly on the outside of the charging station, or via a flexible cable with permanently attached connector on the end. When the charging station is equipped with a permanently fixed cable, the connector end of the cable can be attached directly into the vehicle inlet, similar to using a petrol pump and when no fixed cable is available, a separate male-to-female cable is used to connect the vehicle, either using the charging station, or from a traditional IEC 60309-2 industrial connector.

The Type 2 connector system was originally proposed by Mennekes in 2009 leading to the colloquial name of Mennekes. The system was later tested and standardized by the German Association of the Automotive Industry (VDA) as VDE-AR-E 2623-2-2, and subsequently recommended by the European Automobile Manufacturers Association (ACEA) in 2011. As of 2015, Type 2 is intended to replace the previous vehicle connectors used for AC charging within the European electric vehicle network, displacing both Type 1 (SAE J1772) and Type 3 (EV Plug Alliance Types 3A and 3C; colloquially, Scame) connectors. For DC charging, the Combo 2 socket (Type 2 supplemented with 2 DC pins) shall become standard in cars, replacing Type 4 CHAdeMO. The transition period is scheduled to last until 2020.

The IEC 62196 Type 2 connector is used in a slightly modified form for all European Tesla Model S and Model X vehicles, and the European Tesla Supercharger network. As of 2017 Tesla is the only automaker which offers charging with alternating current and direct current based on the IEC 62196-2 specification. For charging with direct current the specification IEC 62196-3 Combined Charging System (CCS) is favored in Europe.

=== Pins ===
AC and DC operating modes of a Type 2 plug according to IEC 62196 (DC-Low & DC-Mid was withdrawn)

The connectors contain seven contact places: two small and five larger. The top row consists of two small contacts for signaling, the middle row contains three pins, the center pin is used for Earthing, while the outer two pins used for the power supply, optionally in conjunction with the two pins on the bottom row which are also for power supply. Three pins are always used for the same purposes:

- Proximity pilot (PP): pre-insertion signaling
- Control pilot (CP): post-insertion signaling
- Protective earth (PE): full-current protective earthing system—6-millimetre (0.24 in) diameter

The allocation of the four normal power supply pins vary depending on the mode of operation. They are allocated as:

Female connector, middle and bottom row (power pin) allocations
Mode	Maximum		(A1)	(C1)	(E1)
Mode	Volts	Amperes	(B2)		(D2)
Single-phase AC	500V AC	1×80A	Neutral (N)	Earth (PE)	AC (L1)
Single-phase AC	500V AC	1×80A	N/C		N/C
Three-phase AC	500V AC	3×63A	Neutral (N)	Earth (PE)	AC (L1)
Three-phase AC	500V AC	3×63A	AC (L3)		AC (L2)
Combined single-phase AC and low-current DC	500V AC/DC	1×80A (AC) & 1×70A (DC)	Neutral (N)	Earth (PE)	AC (L1)
Combined single-phase AC and low-current DC	500V AC/DC	1×80A (AC) & 1×70A (DC)	DC (+)		DC (-)
Low-current DC	500V DC	1×80A (DC)	N/C	Earth (PE)	N/C
Low-current DC	500V DC	1×80A (DC)	DC (+)		DC (-)
Mid-current DC	500V DC	1×140A (DC)	DC (+)	Earth (PE)	DC (-)
Mid-current DC	500V DC	1×140A (DC)	DC (+)		DC (-)

Some vehicle inlets may contain the extra connections to allow the CCS DC-only charger (high-current DC) to be inserted.

Communication takes place over the CP/PP signaling pins between the charger, cable, and vehicle to ensure that the highest common denominator of voltage and current is selected.

The signaling protocol is identical to that of Type 1 connectors as described in the SAE J1772 standard.

== Gallery ==
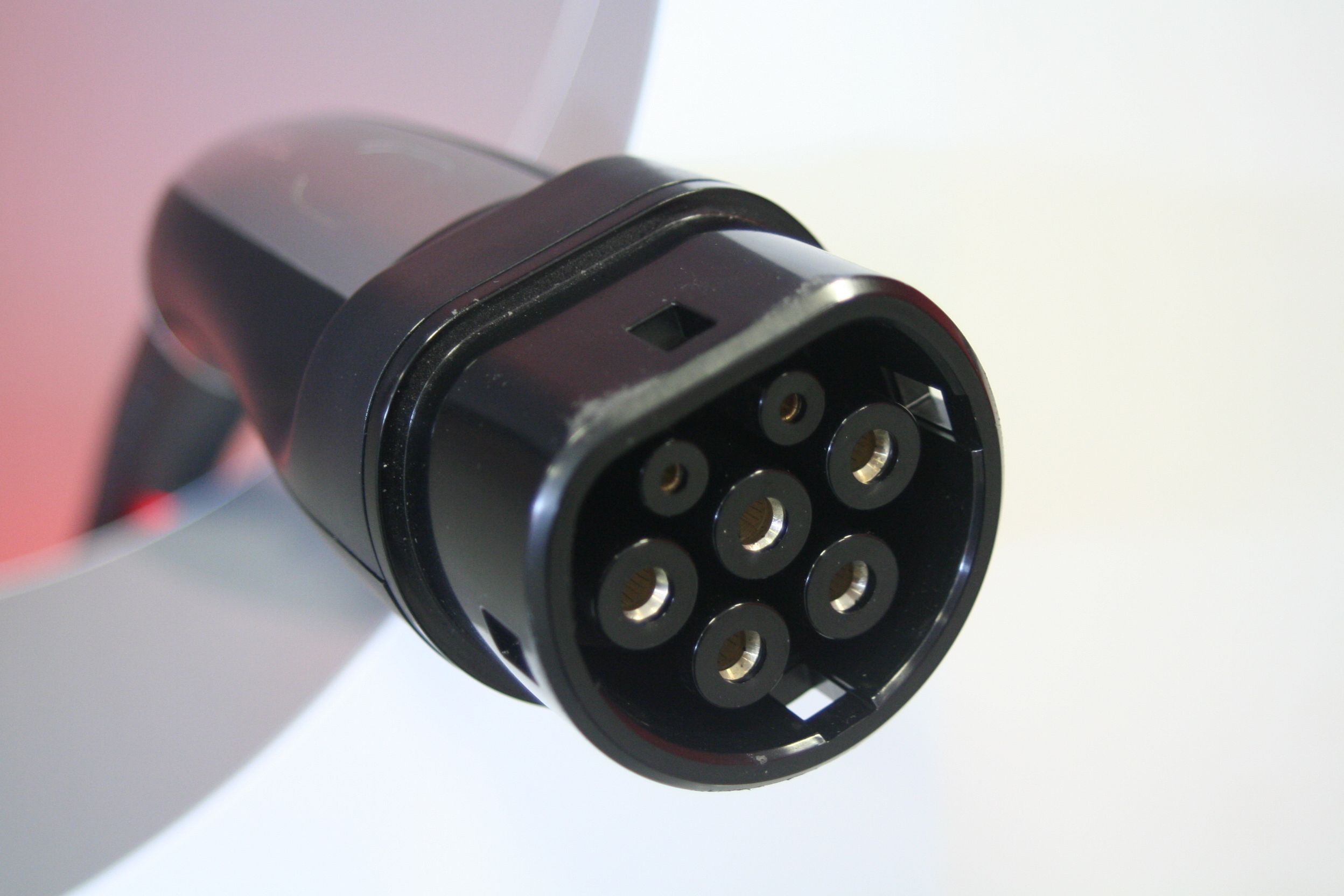
Type 2-compatible female connector found on the end of the permanently-attached connector cable of Tesla Superchargers in Europe

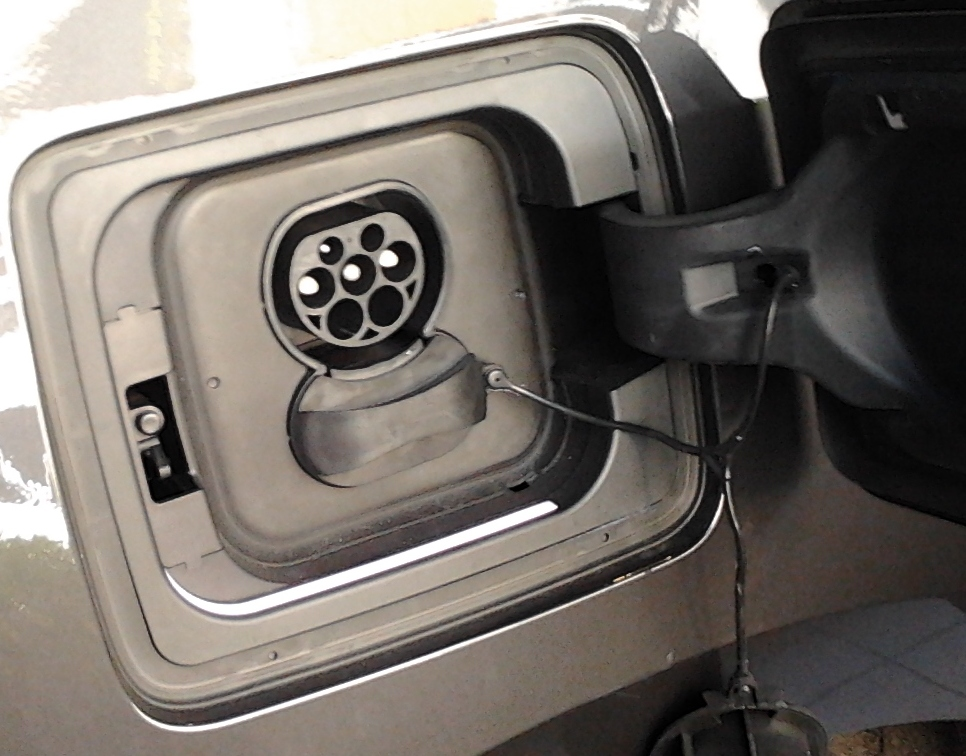
Type 2 male vehicle inlet for electric charging; the closed bottom portion of the inlet covers the two DC pins used for CCS Combo 2

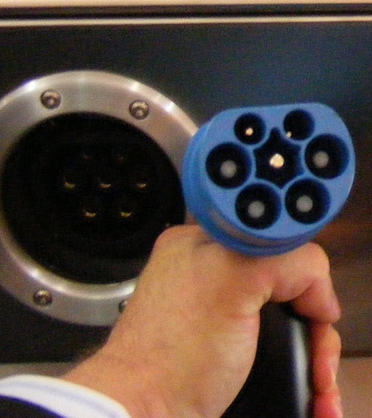
Charging station female socket outlet and matching male plug (blue color). In China only, a male connector is used for both ends of the connecting cable.

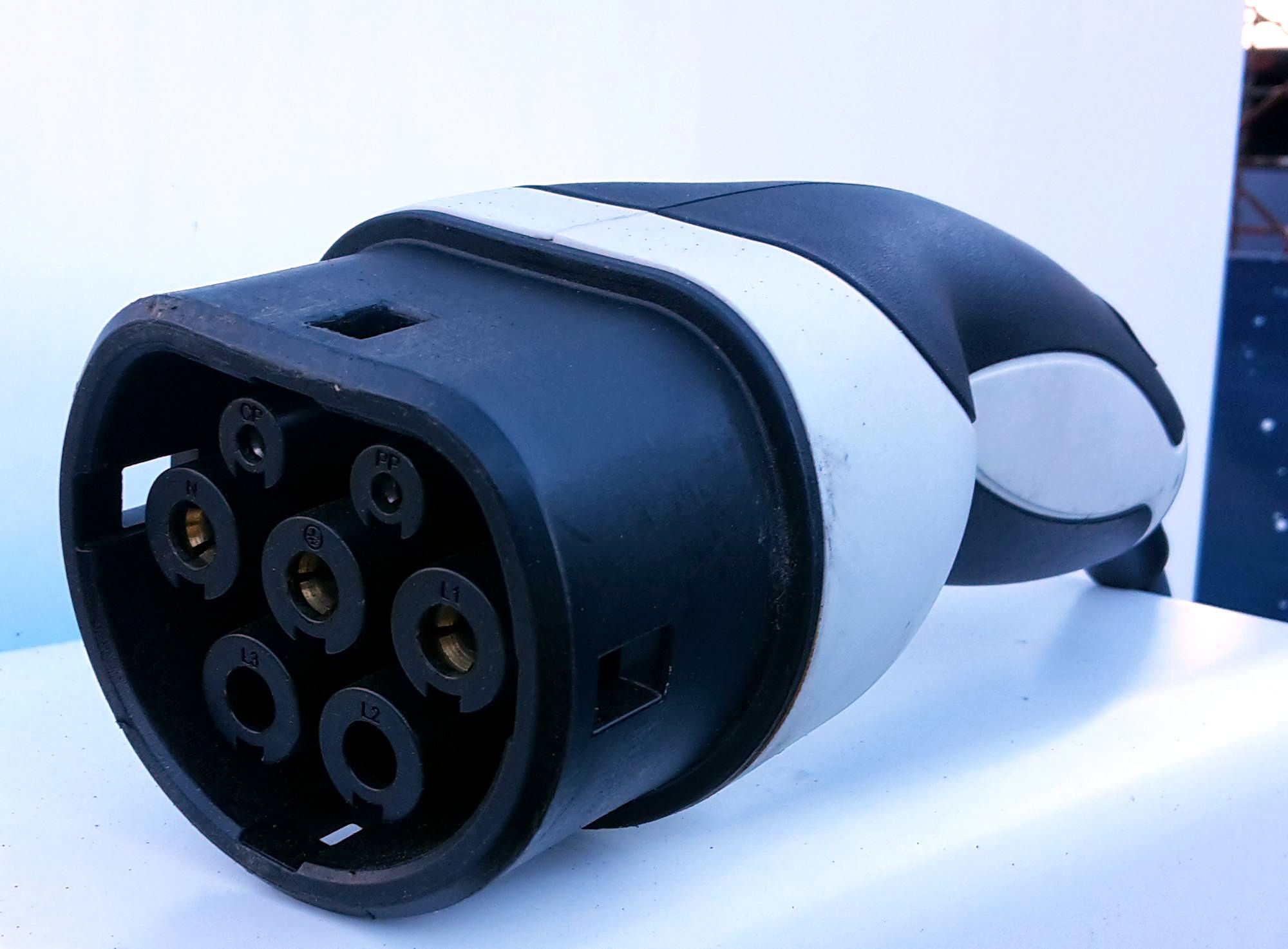
Type 2 female connector (Mennekes)

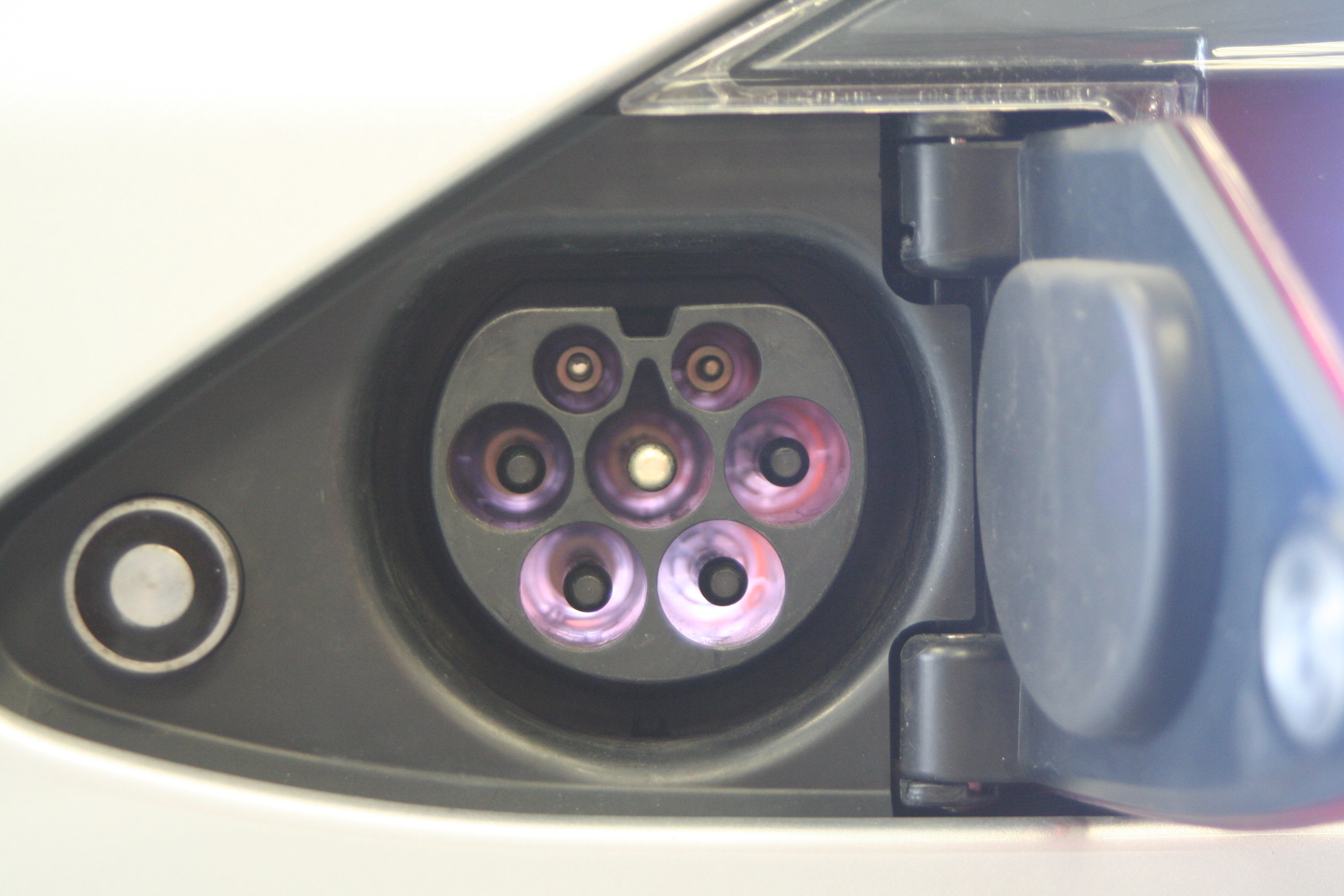
Type 2-compatible 120 kW male vehicle inlet on European Tesla Model S

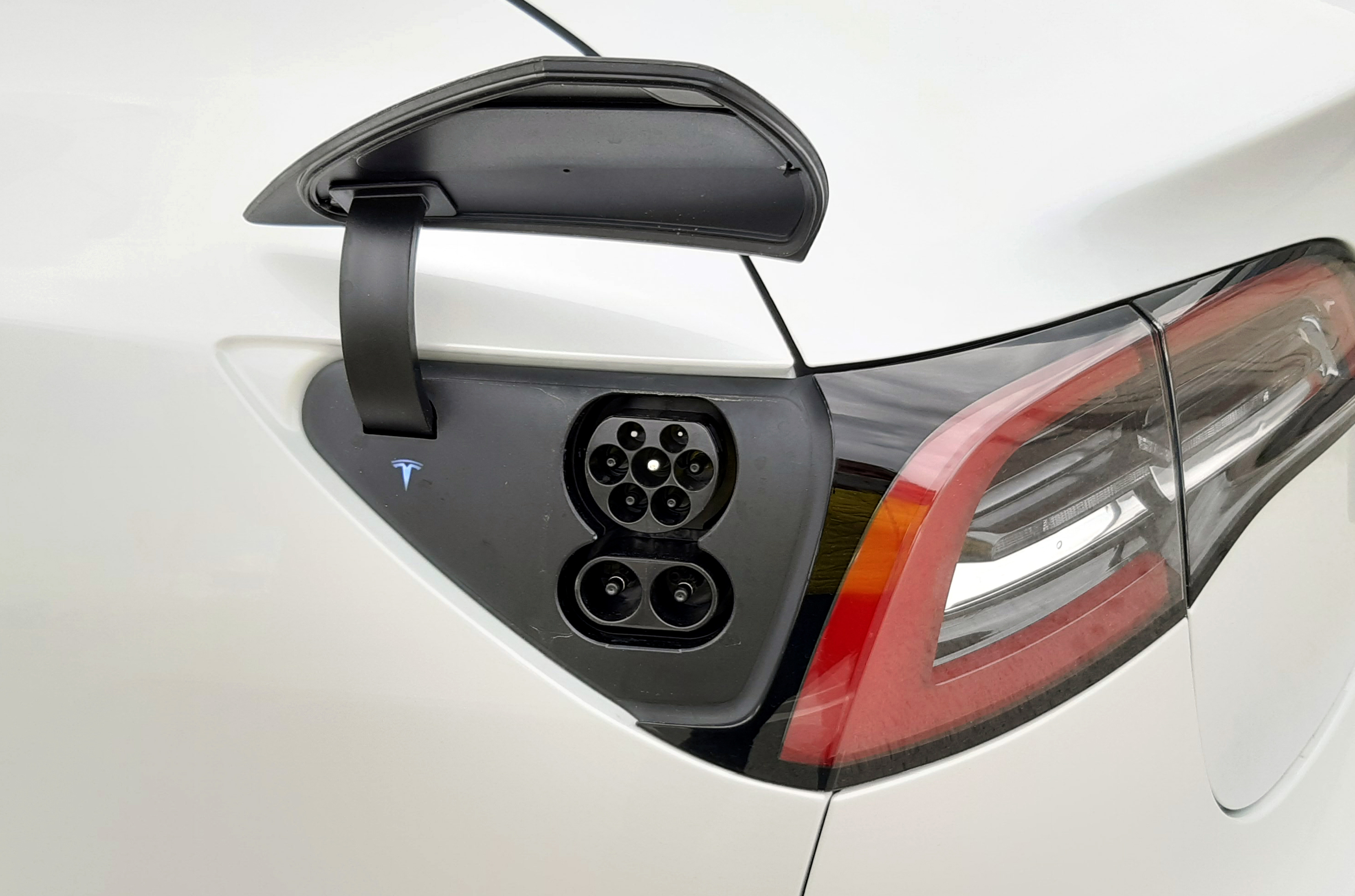
Type 2 (CCS Combo 2) European Tesla Model 3 male vehicle inlet

== See also ==
- IEC 62196, for information about the specification
- CHAdeMO and CCS Combo, for rapid charging.
- SAE J1772, or Type 1 connector, the equivalent AC connector used in North America, South Korea and Japan
