= Electric vehicle charging infrastructure =

Infrastructure system of charging stations to recharge electric vehicles

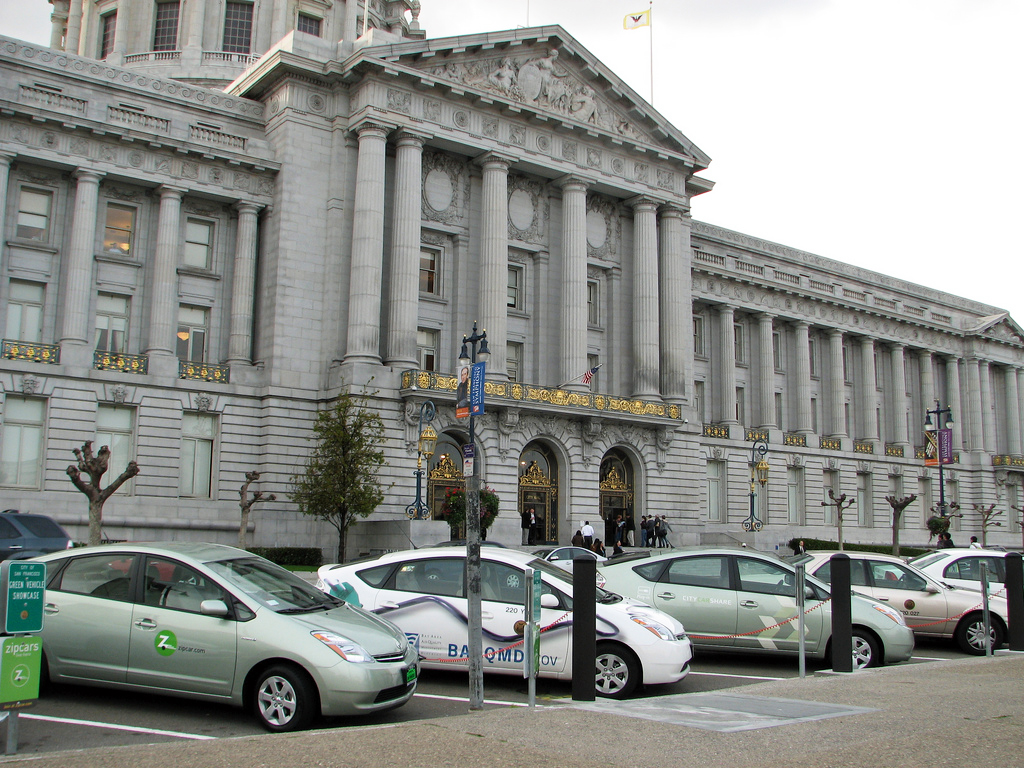
Several plug-in converted Toyota Priuses hybrids recharging at the public stations in front of San Francisco City Hall.

An electric vehicle charging network is an infrastructure system of charging stations to recharge electric vehicles. The term electric vehicle infrastructure (EVI) may refer to charging stations in general or the network of charging stations across a nation or region. Charging network tend to operate through shared systems of access, payment, and service

The proliferation of charging stations can be driven by charging station providers or government investment, and is a key influence on consumer behaviour in the transition from internal combustion engine vehicles to electric vehicles. While charging network vendors have in the past offered proprietary solutions limited to specific manufacturers (ex. Tesla), vendors now usually supply energy to electric vehicles regardless of manufacturer. Public charging networks have also increasingly been shaped by broader access, interoperability, and simpler payment systems.Public charging infrastructure has also grown rapidly worldwide.

== Maps ==
Charging station mapping services typically give the location, power, network, and connector type of publicly available charging stations, while more advanced services give the price and live availability of stations. Large charging networks provide maps of their own stations for customers.

PlugShare is a crowdsourced map of public, private and residential charging locations. The site uses Google Maps to provide a map of charging locations and their own database to filter by charging type. Public chargers, private chargers, and residential charging locations are listed. The service provides an app for iOS and Android which allows users to locate chargers near their current location. An account is needed to view private persons' charging locations, as these locations are at the homes or businesses of Plugshare members. Plugshare was acquired by EVgo in 2021. Plugshare is one of many leading sources of where charge stations exist, however plenty public and private stations are not updated in the app.

Open Charge Map is a non-commercial EV charging data service. They state the aim of providing a single point of reference, in a field of independent, conflicting charging data services.

Zapmap is an electric vehicle charging mapping and payment service in the UK. They share their statistics with the Department for Transport, and many local councils direct their residents to the service for locating charging stations.

OpenStreetMap is an open source map of the world which includes rich support of descriptions on charging stations. The map can be used by anyone under the ODbL license.

== Market growth and scale ==
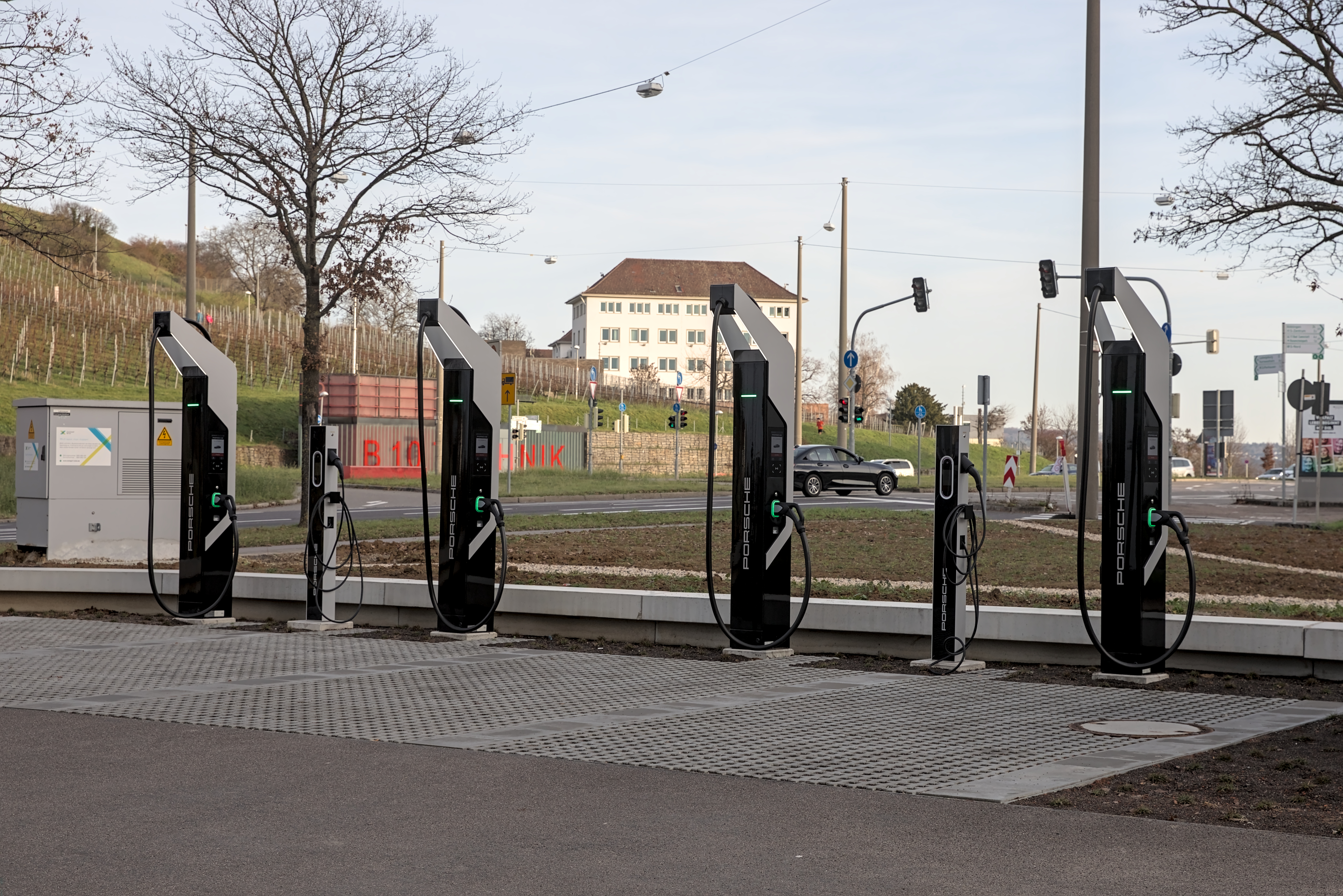
Electric vehicle charging stations in Stuttgart

Public electric vehicle charging infrastructure has expanded worldwide as electric vehicle usage has increased. According to the International Energy Agency, more than 1.3 million public charging points were added globally in 2024. This was an increase of more than 30% over the previous year.

Successful development of public charging infrastructure is evident in Europe. In 2024, the IEA reported that the total number of public charging stations in europe exceeded 1 million. As an additional source for charging infrastructure within the European Union, the European Alternative Fuels Observatory publishes regularly updated statistics.

== Infrastructure providers ==
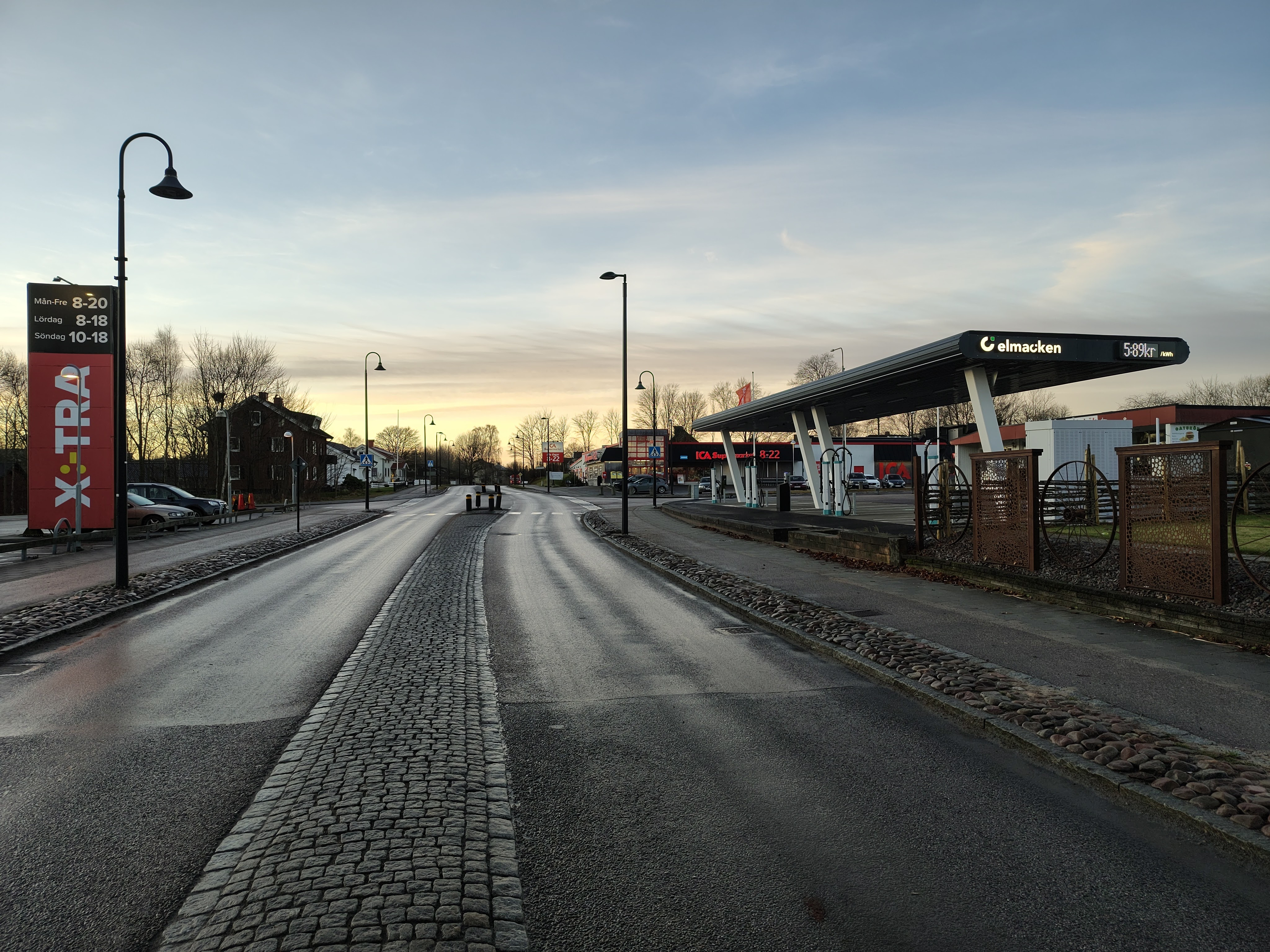
Elmacken charging station with 400 kW fast chargers in Smålandsstenar, Sweden

- American Facilities Professionals provides turn-key installation and integrate EV chargers into existing facility management system for long-term sustainability.
- Blink Charging operates a network with over 50,000 publicly available charging connectors in the US, Europe, and the UK. Also produces chargers for use in private settings.
- ChargePoint includes public charging stations, a consumer subscription plan and utility grid management technology to help electric utility companies to smooth electrical demands on the grid. As of 2025, the ChargePoint network consisted of over 30,000 locations in more than 18 countries.
- Connected Kerb is a UK-based provider of electric vehicle charging infrastructure, founded in 2017, which aims to make EV charging affordable, sustainable and accessible for all regardless of social status, location or physical ability. In November 2021, the company announced plans to install 190,000 on-street residential charging points across the UK by 2030 to help EV users without access to home charging facilities. The CEO is Chris Pateman-Jones.
- ChargeFinder is a mobile and web application designed to assist electric vehicle (EV) drivers in locating and accessing public charging stations for electric automobiles.
- Elektromotive was a UK-based company that manufactured and installed charging infrastructure for electric cars and other electric vehicles using their patented Elektrobay stations. The company has partnerships with major corporations including EDF Energy and Mercedes-Benz to supply charging posts and data services. They have since been absorbed into Chargemaster, now BP Pulse.
- Electrify America is a DC fast charging station network based only in the United States with approximately 730 charging locations as of March 2022, the company was created by the Volkswagen Group after the United States EPA accused them of using defeat devices in its diesel-fueled vehicles.
- EVgo is one of America's largest EV charging networks.
- EV Trail is an American charging infrastructure company. Their aim is to cut rural charging gaps in Colorado.
- FLO is a North American electric vehicle charging network operator and a smart charging solutions provider. FLO operates in the United States and Canada. Their charging stations are assembled in Michigan and Quebec.
- Francis Energy is a Tulsa, Oklahoma-based EV charge point operator with plans to expand into 40 states in 2023, with plans to install 50,000 EV charging ports by 2030 in partnership with municipalities, auto dealers, Tribal Nations, and private businesses.
- Gridserve is a network of rapid chargers at service stations in UK. They acquired many of these chargepoints from Ecotricity's Electric Highway brand.
- Hypercharge is a North American smart EV charging network and solutions provider serving single-family homes, multi-family residential & commercial buildings, and fleet applications. Hypercharge was the first Canada-founded EV charging network to IPO.
- Park & Charge is a European Charging infrastructure for electric vehicles. Park & Charge was founded in 1992 by members of the electric car club in Switzerland (ECS). Today there is a Park & Charge at nearly 500 locations in Switzerland, Germany, Austria, the Netherlands and Italy, offering a safe and easy way for drivers of electric vehicles to charge their vehicle batteries. The locations of the charging stations in Europe will be published in LEMnet internet database which is operated by Park & Charge.
- Lectron is a multinational electric vehicle infrastructure company, known for manufacturing EV chargers, including home charging stations and portable chargers, as well as electric vehicle accessories such as adapters. The firm's products include the V-Box home charging station and charging cables such as J1772-compliant adapters.

== Payment, access, and interoperability ==
Publicly available charging networks have increasingly transitioned away from legacy proprietary or closed networks; they are increasingly influenced by features such greater access to the public, easier payment processes, and interoperability. In the U.S., the federal National Electric Vehicle Infrastructure (NEVI) Formula Program establishes that public charging stations must provide secure payment methods, like contactless cards that allow anyone to use them. In addition, all U.S. public charging stations must provide accessible payments for people with disabilities as well as people with limited ability to speak english.

In Europe, Alternative Fuels Infrastructure Regulation (AFIR) specify that personals shall have the ability to use ad hoc payments to access public recharging stations, as well as requiring pricing to be transparent with respect to the various price components of those services.Overall, the two regulatory processes began to shift from different approaches that utilized membership-based solutions to provide greater access to the public and uniformity among public charging networks.

== Reliability and user experience ==
The size of a charging network does not alone determine its performance. The National Renewable Energy Laboratory has reported that charging-station availability and electric vehicle supply equipment (EVSE) reliability influence electric vehicle adoption, particularly for drivers without access to home charging. A charging network may appear large based on the number of chargers, but user experience can be poor if chargers are inoperable, difficult to use, or already occupied. At locations such as workplaces, higher-power chargers may reduce peak charger occupancy by shortening charging durations, although utilization also depends on vehicle arrival times and the length of time vehicles remain connected. Pricing structures may also affect user experience; subscription-based workplace charging has been studied as a way to reduce cost variability among users whose arrival times are affected by traffic delays.

== Security aspects ==
As a cyber-physical system, EV charging infrastructure faces threats spanning both its information technology layer (back-end management, payment, and roaming systems) and its operational technology layer (charging hardware and grid-facing communication). Regulatory frameworks such as the EU's NIS2 Directive and the US NEVI program mandate cybersecurity baselines for charging network operators.

== Automobile manufacturers ==
The Renault–Nissan Alliance made agreements by 2010 to promote emission-free mobility in France, Israel, Portugal, Denmark and the U.S. state of Tennessee. In 2026, this alliance has evolved into the "Alliance 2030" which is an investment of $25 Billion between Renault Nissan and Mitsubishi to produce 35 new EVs globally and using the North American Charging Standard (NACS) platform in North America to allow vehicles to use Teslas charging network. As of 2026, Nissan has installed high speed charging stations at 90% of Nissan dealerships in Japan.

Tesla Motors, a prominent American manufacturer of electric vehicles, maintains a network of DC fast chargers for their cars (and increasingly other cars) to use. The first Tesla Supercharger stations were unveiled 24 September 2012. As of April 2026, Tesla has 8,537 open supercharging stations with 3,497 in the Asia Pacific area, 3,359 in North America and 1,681 in Europe. There are a total of 80,266 supercharging stalls open globally. Tesla has also added credit-card readers to their V4 supercharging stations allowing non-Tesla owners to charge their vehicles.

== Initiatives by region ==
=== Africa ===
==== South Africa ====
South Africa has a small, but growing EV charging station network, which includes numerous proof of concept high-capacity DC chargers, including three 400 kW chargers at Charge's N12 North West facility, a 200 kW station at the Mall of Africa in Midrand, and a 150 kW one at Canal Walk in Cape Town.

The country's charging network comprises, among other initiatives, the following:

- Public charging stations through a partnership between Eskom and BYD
  - Active charging stations: 0
  - Planned charging stations: 55, with a 2-year horizon
- National Automobile Association of South Africa
  - Active charging stations: 0
  - Planned charging stations: 100, with a 5 to 7 year horizon
- Cape Town-based Charge's solar-powered stations, with R100 million investment from the Development Bank of Southern Africa
  - Active charging stations: 1
  - Planned charging stations: 120 for passenger vehicles (at 150 km intervals, along major highways), and a further 120 for electric trucks

=== Asia ===
==== China ====
Status	Region	Provider	Number	Connector	FastCharge	Started	Updated	Comment
1 Functional	Beijing outskirts	North China Grid	100	(240 V)		2010		plus 3 stations
2 Under Construction	27 cities	State Grid Corp			75 stations	2010		dozens of outlets per station
2 Under Construction	Zhejiang	State Grid Corp	7,200		173 stations	2011		dozens of outlets per station
3 Planned		State Grid Corp	6,209			2010		plus some battery swap stations
4 Proposed		State Grid Corp	220,000		2351 stations	2015		

China's first large electric charging station for electric vehicles—the Tangshan Nanhu EV Charging Station – was put into service on 31 March 2010. Five cities in northern Hebei province – Tangshan, Zhangjiakou, Qinhuangdao, Langfang and Chengde – want to build three charging stations and 100 charging poles in 2010.

Shandong is the province with most car manufacturers in China. The province planned to start in May 2010 with a charging station for 45 cars. According to China's State Grid Corporation, 75 electric vehicle charging stations are planned in 27 cities across China by the end of 2010. Additionally 6,209 charging posts and some battery replacement stations had been planned for 2010. The State Grid Corporation China announced success in distributing 7,031 charge poles in Hangzhou-Jinhua and wants to add 211 additional charging poles in 2011 along with 173 charging stations.

China is planning on installing 10 million electric vehicle charging stations by 2020. In the 12th Five Year Plan (2011–2015) China wants to deploy 2,351 charge and replacement power stations and 220,000 charge spots. The reason is to get rid of crude oil imports which makes for 54 percent of the oil usage and cars accounted for 40 percent of national oil consumption (2010).

According to the National Energy Administration, China had 10.2 million EV chargers nationwide as of June 2024, up 54% from the previous year. As of October 2024, charging infrastructure in China had exceeded a total of 11.88 million units, including 3.39 million public charger and 8.49 million private charger, according to a report by the China Electric Vehicle Charging Infrastructure Promotion Alliance.

==== India ====
India has a burgeoning EV charging ecosystem. Primary providers are Tata Power, Joulepoint, and Fortum.

==== Japan ====
Infrastructure is planned by Better Place and Nissan for Yokohama.

==== Singapore ====
Infrastructure is planned by Robert Bosch and Keppel Energy for Singapore

==== South Korea ====
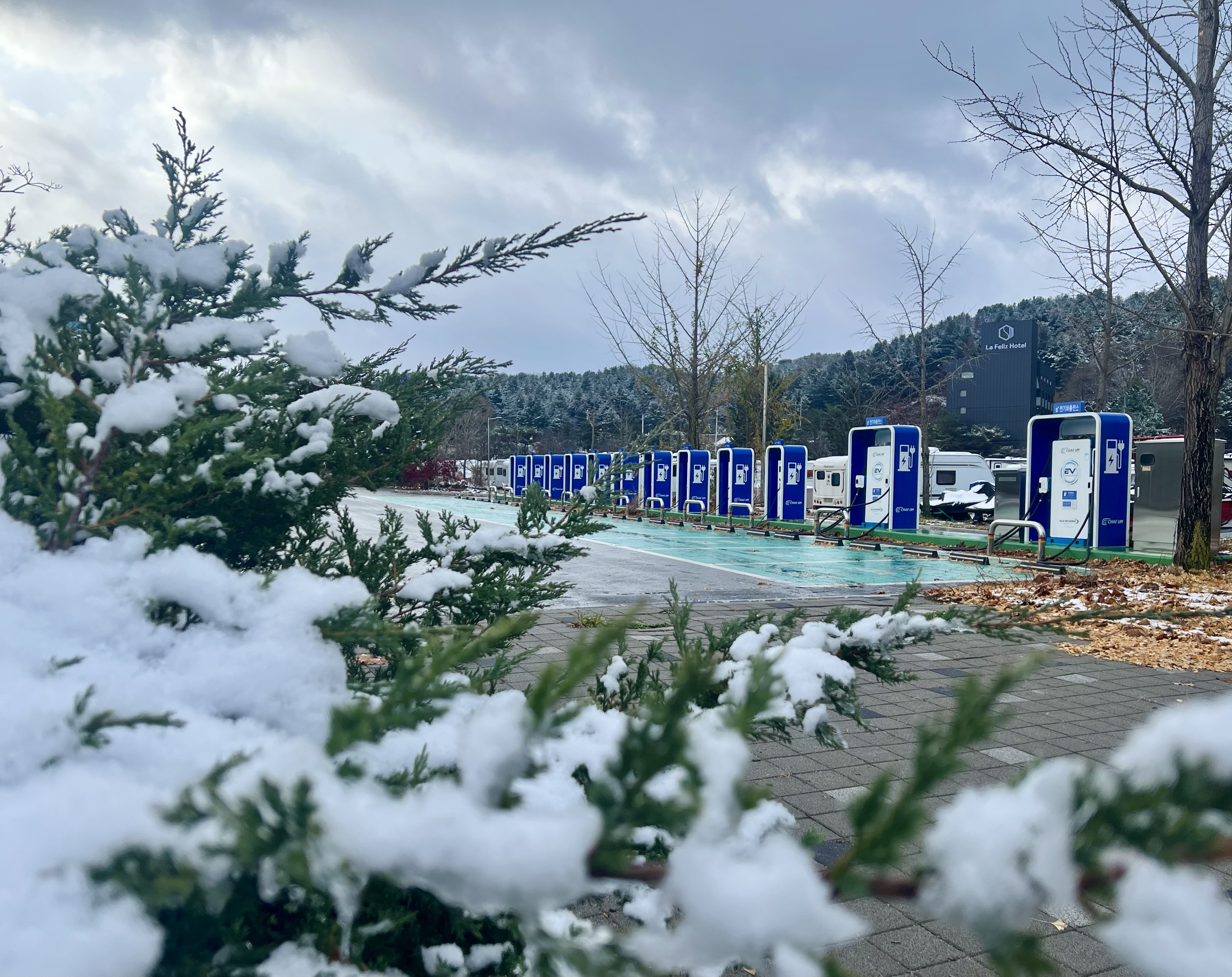
Charging stations in Chuncheon, Gangwon Province, South Korea

The electric vehicle charging industry of South Korea consists of various domestic and foreign organizations. It has produced thousands of chargers, which have exceeded the number of electric vehicles in the country. The expansion of EV charging infrastructure has been supported by funding from the South Korean government. As of 2024, most charging stations installed in South Korea were underground.

=== Europe ===
The AVERE / European Association for Battery, Hybrid and Fuel Cell Electric Vehicles was founded in 1978 and is a member of the World Electric Vehicle Association. AVERE is also the parent organization of CITELEC / Association of European Cities interested in Electric Vehicles and Eurelectric. The European Commission has funded the "Green Cars Initiative" since November 2008. In March 2011, the European Commission along with forty two partners from the industries, utilities, electric car manufacturers, municipalities, universities and technology and research institutions founded the "Green eMotion" initiative funded with €41.8 million under the Seventh Research and Development Framework Programme. The defined goal is to provide an interoperable electromobility framework to align the ongoing regional and national electromobility initiatives. At the same time the partners unveiled the "Transport 2050" plan which includes the aim to half the number of conventionally fuelled cars in cities by 2030 and phase them out by 2050.

In the second position paper (March 2011) of the European Automobile Manufacturers Association it is recommended to equip public charging stations with IEC 62196 Type 2 Mode 3 connectors with transitional solutions to be allowed up to 2017. Nevertheless, multiple socket types (IEC 60309-2 Mode 2 types, IEC 62196 Mode 3 types, Chademo and standard home socket outlets Mode 2) have been deployed already. Politics have called for single European-wide standard and in case of a market failure the EU will define the infrastructure side requirements by law in 2013. As expected from lobbying the European Commission has proposed in January 2013 to only use the Type 2 connector type as the single standard to end prior uncertainty about the charging station equipment in Europe. Common standards for electric charging points across Europe must be designed and implemented by December 2015.

In the EU, the Alternative Fuels Infrastructure Regulation (AFIR) sets binding minimum deployment rules, including fast-charging coverage along the core TEN-T network.

==== Czech Republic ====
Status	Region	Provider	Number	Connector	FastCharge	Started	Updated	Comment
1 Functional	Prague	ČEZ Group	25	230 V/16 A Type E	400 V/32 A Type 2	2011	2013	
1 Functional	(other)	ČEZ Group	9	230 V/16 A Type E	400 V/32 A Type 2	2011	2013	

Power supplier ČEZ has announced to have 50 recharging stations to be ready by the end of 2011. By June 2012 the company had 14 public and 6 private charging stations installed with more to come in Mlada Boleslav at the Skoda facilities. These charging stations use a combination of 230 V mains connector (Type E) at 16 A and a 400 V three-phase Mennekes connector (Type 2) at 16 A or 32 A.

==== Denmark / Norway ====
Status	Region	Provider	Number	Connector	FastCharge	Started	Updated	Comment
1 Functional	Denmark	Clever	500+	Type 2 socket	CHAdeMO, CCS and AC type2 plug	2012	2015	The largest rapid charge network in Denmark, often located near shopping areas.
1 Functional	Denmark	E.on	700	Type2 socket	CHAdeMO, CCS and AC	2013	2015	14(7 locations in both directions) RapidChargers located at freeway stops, rest is 11 kW AC
2 Offline	Copenhagen	BetterPlace	700	?		2012	2013	plus 8 fast charge stations and 18 switch stations
3 Planned	Oslo, Copenhangen	Move About	50+			2013		Think

There are 2 major charge point operators in Denmark, E.on are operating mostly fast chargers, only installing rapids at freeways, while Clever is installing both fast and rapids in city centers.

Both E.on and Clever are taking part in installing rapid chargers at freeway lay-bys, with Clever installing 4 of them and E.on a total of 20 at 10 different locations.

Besides E.on and Clever, local energy companies are installing free-to-use charge points, often only consisting of a CEE plug, so the users have to bring their own EVSE box.

Infrastructure was planned by Better Place and has been installed by Coulomb Technologies for Copenhagen. Denmark has enacted policies that create a tax differential between zero-emission vehicles and traditional cars to accelerate the transition to electric cars. Better Place had announced the network to be complete in December 2012, however the stations and chargers have been switched off due to the bankruptcy of Better Place Danmark A/S in June 2013. By April 2013 the network had consisted of 700 public charging spots, 18 battery switch stations and 8 fast charger stations.

In 2013 E.on bought the charge points from Better Place and restarted the network, without the battery swap system.

Norway has a tradition in building electric vehicles based on the Think Car. It is popular in Southern Norway (Oslo), Southern Sweden (Gothenburg) and Eastern Denmark (Copenhagen). The concept of the "Move About" project will provide 60 new Think cars in a test including charging stations in 50 towns in the area until 2013. The MoveAbout concept is actually derived from a car sharing system where cars are not offered for purchase but for leasing.

==== Estonia ====
Estonia became the first country to complete the deployment of a nationwide electric car charging network, and as of December 2013, is the only country with such geographical coverage. The Estonian network has the highest concentration of DC chargers in Europe.

Status	Region	Provider	Number	Connector	FastCharge	Started	Updated	Comment
1 Functional	Nationwide	G4S	700	CHAdeMO and Type2 AC outlet	200	2012	2013-02-22	coop Mitsubishi, ABB

The Estonian government and Kredex launched the charging station network project in 2011 in cooperation with ABB, funded partially by the Mitsubishi Corporation. The nationwide electric car charging network officially opened with 165 fast chargers on 20 February 2013. These chargers were installed in all urban settlements with more than 5,000 inhabitants. In addition, chargers are installed on the all major roads at intervals of no more than 60 kilometres (37 mi). That makes it possible to reach every point within the country without a supply interruption. All of the Terra 51 CHAdeMO-type DC chargers are fast-charging, only needing between 15 and 30 minutes to fully charge a car's battery.

==== France ====
Status	Region	Provider	Number	Connector	FastCharge	Started	Updated	Comment
1 Functional	Paris	Paris	101	mains (230 V, 16 A)	(Marechal)	2010		free of charge
1 Functional	Strasbourg		135	Type 3a (230 V, 16 A)	-	2010		Toyota Prius test drive
2 Under Construction	Île-de-France		300	Type 3		2011		Renault–Nissan test drive
2 Under Construction	Western France	Vinci Autoroutes	738	?	?	2012		coop. Renault
2 Under Construction	Paris-Yvelines		200	Type 3	CHAdeMO	2011		
3 Planned	Monaco		300		3x	2011		
4 Proposed	France	EDF	400,000	?		2015	2010	

In France, Électricité de France (EDF) and Toyota are installing recharging points for PHEVs on roads, streets and parking lots.

The Renault–Nissan Alliance and the largest French electric utility, Electricite de France (EDF) have signed an agreement to promote emission-free mobility in France. The move aims at offering all-electric volume vehicles from 2011 — including a countrywide network of battery charging stations. The partner Vinci Autoroutes has announced to rebuild 738 car parks along motorways with at least 5 parking lots for charging electric vehicles – construction will start at the end of 2011 and the full extent will be reached in 2013.

The Environment Ministry of France, led by Jean-Louis Borloo has announced the goal to install 400,000 charging points in France by 2015. Jean-Louis Borloo has assigned 1.5 billion Euros in 2009 to support research and preparations for the first part of the electric vehicle network with 75,000 charging stations.

Meanwhile, the pilot project in Paris has started with the introduction of 100 Z.E. cars. The map of charging stations can be downloaded from the city website. There are 101 locations with 178 charging points across the town and its suburbs (May 2010). The charging points have either Schuko-like sockets (Type E / 2P+T) or a Marechal plug on spiral cord where both variants are rated at 230 V/16 A (mains).

Schneider Electric supports test drives in France with its charging stations that include a Type 3 (EV Plug Alliance) connector. In Strasbourg 100 Toyota Prius were tested with 135 recharging spots beginning Q1 2010 (Type 3 single-phase). In the suburbs of Paris there will be 300 recharging spots to be installed in Q1 2011. In the "Projet Klébér" the Strasbourg vehicle fleet may use the charging stations of EnBW in Mannheim, Karlsruhe, Stuttgart and vice versa. In Yvelines near Paris the fleet test SAVE (Seine Aval Véhicule Électrique) was started in April 2011 – until September 2011 a number of 200 charging stations will be built.

The Monaco government has sketched a plan to run a fleet test in 2011 including 300 charging stations and 3 fast-charge stations.

==== Italy ====
Status	Region	Provider	Number	Connector	FastCharge	Started	Updated	Comment
1 Functional	Pisa	Enel	35		Type 2 Mode 3	2010	2011	Enel Drive, coop. Daimler or Renault–Nissan
1 Functional	Rome	Enel	59		Type 2 Mode 3	2010	2011	Enel Drive, coop. Daimler or Renault–Nissan
1 Functional	Milan, Bologna	Enel	4		Type 2 Mode 3	2010	2011	Enel Drive, coop. Daimler or Renault–Nissan
1 Functional	Bolzano		4	domestic	-	2009	2010	E-Move solar stations
1 Functional	Rome, Milan, Pisa, Bologna	Enel	40 (62)		Type 2 Mode 3		2012	E-Mobility Italy, coop. Daimler
2 Under Construction	Rome, Milan, Pisa, Bologna	Enel	400*		Type 2 Mode 3	2008		E-Mobility Italy, coop. Daimler
3 Planned	Parma		300	?	?	2011	(2012)	Zero Emission City / Fiat
4 Proposed	Lombardy	Enel	150	?	?	2010		coop. EDF, Endesa, Renault–Nissan (plus 120 private stations)

The Renault–Nissan group – including EDF – has enlarged its scope with partnering to the Italian utility Enel and Spanish utility Endesa in March 2010. Renault–Nissan offers a broader range by providing 60 all-electric vehicles – the Kangoo Express Z.E. and the Renault Fluence Z.E – to the new pilot project "E-Moving" in Italy. The project will start to install 270 charge points in the Lombardy region (including the cities of Milan and Brescia) up to June 2010. This "E-Moving" network will contain 150 public charging stations to be put up until the end of 2010.

The Italian Enel company had an early agreement with Daimler to run a test with their Smart line of cars. Enel has started the "emobility Italy" program in cooperation with Daimler in 2008 – this program will put up 400 public and private charging stations in Rome, Milan and Pisa with charging stations to be built since September 2010. The project was supposed to start in 2011 with a test run going for 48 months – since 5. April 2012 the Smart drive E-Mobility program is ready. The 100 public charging stations in Rome are built with a three-phase Type 2 Mennekes connector while the additional 50 home charging stations are built with a single-phase Type 3 Scame connector.

The E-Move charging stations around Bolzano allow for a test drive of connecting solar panels directly to light vehicles for charging.

The Zero Emission City Parma is a regional project with a 9 million Euro funding to create 300 charging stations along with 900 electric vehicles until 2015. The project is expected to go fully operational by the end of 2012, with 300 points of charge installed and 400/450 electric vehicles circulating.

==== Germany ====
Status	Region	Provider	Number	Connector	FastCharge	Started	Updated	Comment
1 Functional	BDEW energy providers summary		5500	(counting publicly accessible stations)			2015	
1 Functional	Germany	Park & Charge	115	CEE blue (230 V, 16 A)		1998	2011	
1 Functional	Germany	Drehstromnetz	190	CEE blue (230 V, 16 A)	CEE red (400 V, 32 A)	2006	2011	Drehstromnetz
1 Functional	Berlin	Vattenfall	42	mains (230 V, 16 A)	Type 2 Mode 3 (400 V, 32 A)	2009	2011	MINI E
1 Functional	Berlin	RWE	77 (154)	mains (230 V, 16 A)	Type 2 Mode 3 (400 V, 32 A)	2009	2010	E-Mobility
1 Functional	Germany	ladenetz.de	150	mains (230 V, 16 A)	Type 2 Mode 3 (400 V, 32 A)	2010	2012	cooperation of municipal utilities
1 Functional	Rhein-Ruhr	RWE	165 (330)	mains (230 V, 16 A)	Type 2 Mode 3 (400 V, 32 A)	2010	2011	E-Mobility
1 Functional	Koeln-Bonn	RWE	57 (114)	mains (230 V, 16 A)	Type 2 Mode 3 (400 V, 32 A)	2010	2011	E-Mobility
1 Functional	Rhein-Main	RWE	34 (68)	mains (230 V, 16 A)	Type 2 Mode 3 (400 V, 32 A)	2010	2011	E-Mobility
1 Functional	Hamburg	RWE / Orlen	28 (56)	mains (230 V, 16 A)	Type 2 Mode 3 (400 V, 32 A)	2010	2011	E-Mobility
1 Functional	(other)	RWE	98 (196)	mains (230 V, 16 A)	Type 2 Mode 3 (400 V, 32 A)	2010	2011	E-Mobility
1 Functional	Munich	E.ON	21	mains (230 V, 16 A)	Type 2 (was CEEplus)	2009	2010	eflott (Audi e-tron), BMW MINI E
1 Functional	Stuttgart	EnBW	25	mains (230 V, 16 A)	-	2010	2011	Elektronauten 500
1 Functional	Stuttgart/Karlsruhe	EnBW	42 (84)	mains (230 V, 16 A)	Type 2 Mode 3	2011		MeRegionMobil
1 Functional	Bavaria/Saxonia	E.ON	8	CCS Combo2 (50 kW)		2014		Schaufenster Elektromobilität
2 Under Construction	Germany	ladenetz.de	100	mains (230 V, 16 A)	Type 2 Mode 3 (400 V, 32 A)	2012		cooperation of municipal utilities
2 Under Construction	Stuttgart/Karlsruhe	EnBW	260	mains (230 V, 16 A)	Type 2 Mode 3 (400 V 63 A)	2011		MeRegioMobil
2 Under Construction	Munich	E.ON	200	mains (230 V, 16 A)	Type 2		2011	eflott (Audi e-tron), BMW MINI E
2 Under Construction	Hamburg	Vattenfall	50	mains (230 V, 16 A)	Type 2 Mode 3 (400 V, 32 A)	2011		Green eMobility
2 Under Construction	Berlin	RWE	500		Type 2 Mode 3 (400 V, 32 A)	2011		E-Mobility
2 Under Construction	Rhein-Ruhr	RWE	400		Type 2 Mode 3 (400 V, 32 A)	2011		E-Mobility coop. Renault–Nissan
3 Planned	BDEW energy providers summary		10000	(additional publicly accessible stations)			2017	
3 Planned	Baden-Württemberg	EnBW	700			2012		Landesinitiative Elektromobilität

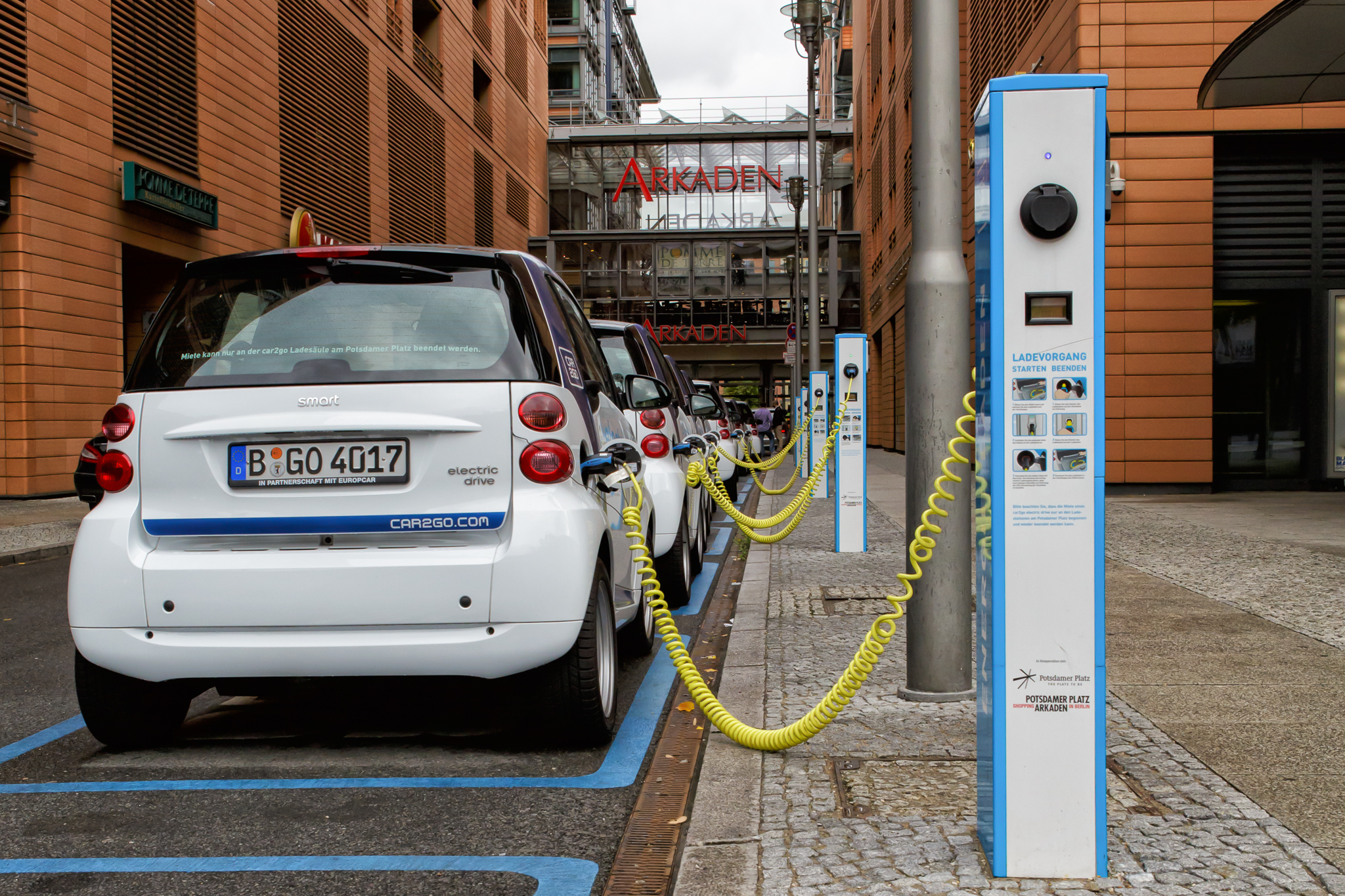
Several Smart electric drive cars charging at the Potsdamer Platz in Berlin.

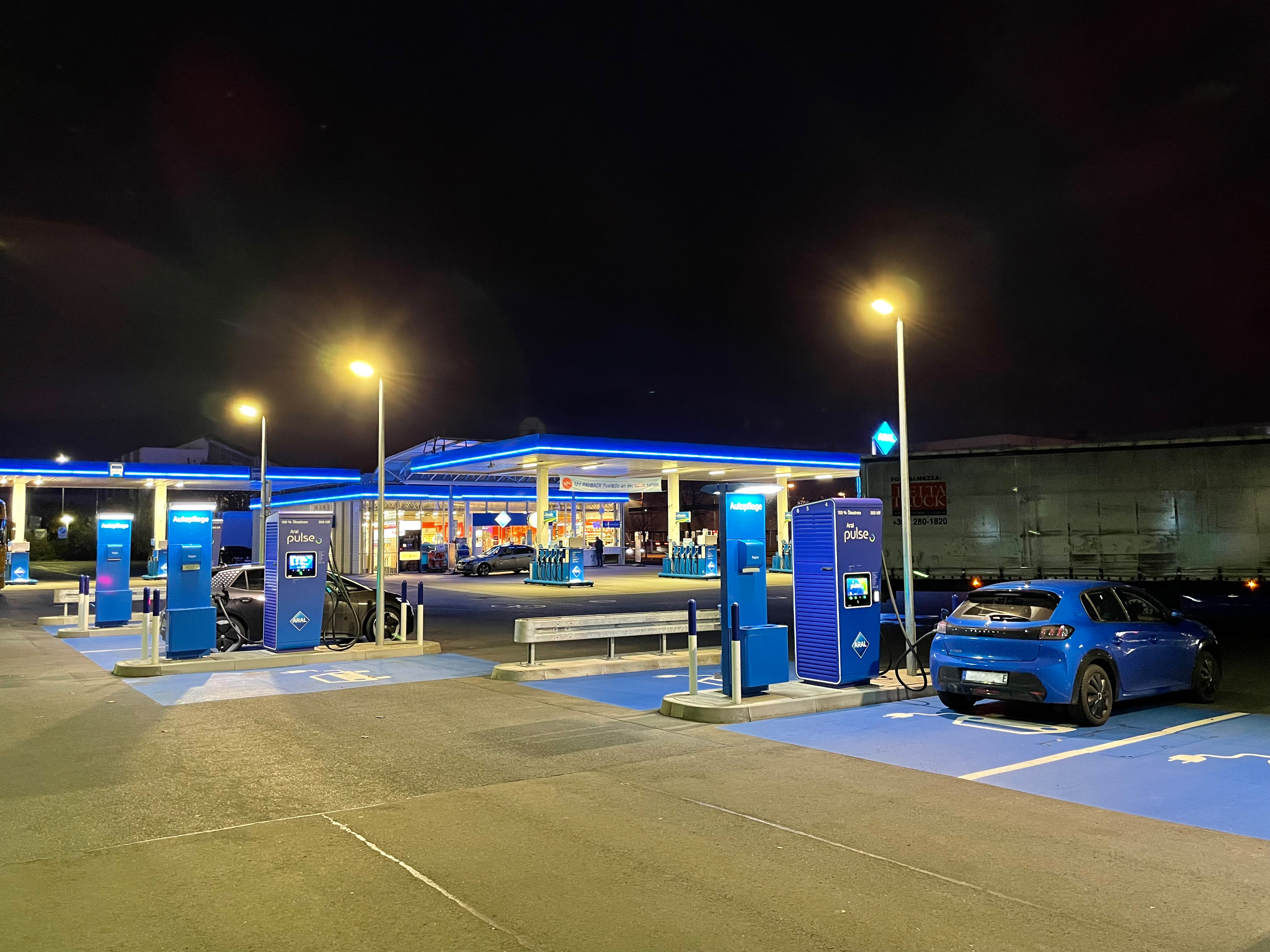
Aral Pulse charging stations in front of a Aral-branded BP gasoline station

Germany has four major transmission system operators (50Hertz, Amprion, TenneT, TransnetBW). They try to set themselves into the position to sell electricity power to electric vehicle owners by becoming also the operators of the upcoming electric vehicle networks. To that avail, they offered partnerships to the German car makers, where they provided charging stations for field tests.

Carmaker Daimler AG and utility RWE AG are running a joint electric car and charging station test project in the German capital, Berlin, called "E-Mobility Berlin.". They have set up 60 charging stations in Berlin (September 2009) and are in the process of extending the system to include 500 charging stations. Daimler has provided for 100 Smart electric drive cars to the project. The second phase started in November 2010. The RWE subsidiary "RWE Mobility" has created cooperations with the automobilist club ADAC, car rental service Sixt and car park provider APCOA to equip all locations with charging stations. since mid of 2009. Renault joined the RWE Mobility program in September 2009 whereby the project goals of erecting charging stations were enlarged to mid of 2011 Renault's partner Nissan has joined the RWE-mobility program on 21. June 2010 announcing that RWE will create a network of 1000 charging stations until the end of the year 2010 focusing on the Berlin and Rhein-Ruhr region. On 28. August a cooperation with fuel retailer PKN Orlen (owning 2700 gasoline stations in Poland, Czech Republic and Germany) was announced – they are starting to equip 30 gasoline stations in Hamburg with charging points for electric vehicles. The current list of RWE-mobility charging stations contains 500 locations in Germany, 50 locations in the Netherlands, 11 in Poland and Austria plus a few stations in other neighbouring countries – also RWE has switched all of its charging stations to Type 2 sockets.

Carmaker BMW and utility Vattenfall run a joint electric car and charging test project called "MINI E" in the German capital, Berlin. They are in the process of erecting 50 charging stations and the project lends 50 BMW Mini cars to citizens. The project started in June 2009 and a second phase has been started in December 2009. Up to June 2011 there were 42 public charge points by Vattenfall in Berlin and the company is in the process of building 50 public charge points in Hamburg. While the earliest charging stations were using CEEplus sockets the newer charging stations are built to Type 2 Mode 3 sockets.

Carmaker VW and utility E.ON run a joint electric car and charging station test project in the German capital, Berlin and in Wolfsburg. The "Electric Mobility Fleet Test" was started as a research project with mostly partners in German universities using the VW hybrid cars (to be tested in 2010). E.ON has later joined also in the MINI E project providing the infrastructure in Munich which was started in Juli 2009. erecting an initial series of 11 charging stations (May 2010) enlarging it continuously (21 locations in December 2010). The region test in Munich has been extended by BMW i3 and BMW i8 prototypes (project i) as well as Audi e-tron models (project eflott) in 2011. E.ON has announced to provide the eflott project with 200 public charging stations the Munich region.

Carmaker Daimler, the utility EnBW and the government of Baden-Württemberg have announced on 18. June 2010 to enlarge the "Landesinitiative Elektromobilität" program with the "e-mobility Baden-Württemberg" project that includes erecting 700 charging stations in the state until the end of 2011. Additionally there will be 200 electric vehicles added to the test including some electric trucks. The government of Baden-Württemberg has assigned 28.5 million Euros to support EV research up to 2014. Meanwhile, EnBW has sponsored 500 E-Bikes in the Elektronauten project in 2010 which can use 13 charging stations in the Stuttgart region. EnBW has claimed to offer 250 charging stations for the Elektronauten 500 project in May 2011 although the map has not been updated. Bosch has developed a new charging station type for EnBW that is capable for 63A – the station was certified on 11. April 2011 by DEKRA and EnBW has announced to install 260 charge stations in the following weeks for MeRegioMobil project in Stuttgart and Karlsruhe. In November 2011 the car2go project announced to go to Stuttgart in 2012 – EnBW reassured to have 500 charging spots ready in time with the roll out of the car2go vehicles in the second half of 2012.

The German government has announced to support a fleet of 1 million electric cars in Germany by 2020. There are 500 million Euros assigned to the Federal Ministry of Economics and Technology (Germany) to support research and pilot projects in Germany. The ministry has created a dedicated coordination office in the "Gemeinsame Geschäftsstelle Elektromobilität der Bundesregierung (GGEMO)" (Joint Agency for Electric Mobility (of the Federal Government)) which was opened in February 2010. The GGEMO has coordinated a partnership program with the German car industry named "Nationale Plattform Elektromobilität (NPE)" inaugurated on 3 May 2010, in the German Chancellery.

The NPE partnership is supposed to detail the plans for network evolution. The technical standardization part is mostly concentrated in the Deutsche Kommission Elektrotechnik (DKE) of the Association for Electrical, Electronic and Information Technologies (VDE) – the "Standardization Overview on E-Mobility" shows a wide range of efforts from electric grid management to the charging station infrastructure to the car charger electronics. The NPE partnership has published an interim report on 30 November 2010, showing a test fleet of 2800 electric vehicles and 2500 charging stations in 8 test regions.

The German government has announced that it will not install a rebate system for the introduction of electric cars but that it will reshape the legal provisions to quickly create a charging station network in Germany. Bernd Pischetsrieder (formerly Volkswagen) points to studies saying that most of the current buyers of electric cars did already own multiple cars so that a rebate plan would merely come out as a subvention of a consumer class that can afford the expense anyway.

The VDE E-mobility congress on the subject was held in Leipzig on 8./9. November 2010. During the congress a large consumer study was presented that showed some 64 percent want to buy an electric car. The study did also look at the requirements to the charging process – 51 percent of consumers in Germany expect a car to be charged in less than 2 hours, up to 4 hours is acceptable to 60 percent of consumers. 64 percent of consumers expect to charge in their own garage, 21 percent want to frequent a central charging station while casual charging in parking lots of shops and company grounds is expected by a mere 6 and 4 percent respectively. The maximum travel distance shows mixed results – while 53 percent say that 300 km is enough there are also 31 percent who like to travel 450 to 1000 km until required to recharge.

The interim report of the NPE partnership classifies electric vehicles in 3 categories: all-electric city cars, family cars and light trucks with an electric range for city transport. Development is sketched in phases 2010–2013, 2014–2017, 2018–2020 and post-2020 with the government goal to get 1 million electric cars up to 2020 and 6 million electric cars up to 2030 (for comparison there are 44 million cars in Germany in 2010). Batteries are not expected to show great advancements in terms of capacity but the safety will increase and the prices will fall to 250-€300 /kWh in the 2018–2020 time frame. In the post-2020 time frame new battery types are expected – instead of lithium-ion the fourth generation batteries will be introduced to the mobility market including lithium-air, lithium-sulfur and zinc-air batteries. As for charging stations a wide network of fast-charging points is considered possible with 22 kW (400 V 32 A) stations to be introduced in 2010-2013 and 44 kW (400 V 63 A) stations to be introduced in 2014–2017. For the time beyond 2020 there is an expectation of charging stations at 60 kW (400 V DC 150 A) allowing to charge the standard 20kWh battery pack to 80% in less than 10 minutes whereas this station type requires integration with smart grid technology and a strict worldwide standard (including SAE procedures). The "early adoptors" of electric vehicles are identified to be from the middle class owning multiple cars as well as owning a garage – the existence of a public network of charging stations is considered to be not (sic!) a prerequisite for market introduction in the first phases. Instead government funds should back the investments in privately owned charging stations for example with faster tax write off and cheap credits from the government KfW bank.

A preliminary review of the Mercedes / RWE test drive in the smart ed project shows the importance of vehicle-to-grid communications in charging stations as an incentive to charge at night times. While most US households own a garage even for small cars the situation is different in Central Europe where public charging stations are needed.

==== Switzerland ====
Status	Region	Provider	Number	Connector	FastCharge	Started	Updated	Comment
1 Functional	Switzerland	Park & Charge	230	CEE blue (230 V, 16 A)		1992	2011	
1 Functional	Switzerland	Plug'n Roll	60	Type 2		2016	2017	

The charging station network in Switzerland is derived from research in solar cars. In 1992 the government decided to support a charging station network. The network has since extended to neighbouring countries – in 2010 the Park & Charge network in Switzerland, Germany and Austria did encompass 500 charging locations, additionally there a few charging locations in the Netherlands and Italy.

Plug'n Roll was a major smart EV charging network in Switzerland until it was taken over by its competitor Avia Volt in April 2025.

==== Iceland ====
Status	Region	Provider	Number	Connector	FastCharge	Started	Updated	Comment
1 Functional	Iceland	Orka náttúrunnar	29	Type 1		2017	2020	
1 Functional	Iceland	Orka náttúrunnar	99	Type 2		2017	2020	
1 Functional	Iceland	Orka náttúrunnar	42	CCS		2017	2020	
1 Functional	Iceland	Orka náttúrunnar	42	CHAdeMo		2017	2020	
1 Functional	Iceland	Ísorka	408	Various		2017	2020	
1 Functional	Iceland	Various	23	Various		2017	2020	

Iceland has two major operators of public electric charging stations, Ísorka and Orka náttúrunnar. At launch, both stations did not charge for electricity at their stations, but Orka náttúrunnar started charging on 1 February 2018 and Ísorka started charging on 18 August 2017. A payment card is needed from these vendors to use their stations. As of 2018 there are 31 stations from Orka náttúrunnar, as of 2020 there are 408 stations from Ísorka and as of 2019 there are 23 towns and hotels with independent public charging stations.

==== Ireland ====
Status	Region	Provider	Number	Connector	FastCharge	Started	Updated	Comment
1 Functional	Ireland	ESB ecars	1000	Type 2 Mode 3	22 kW 3-Phase 230 V	2010	2014	
1 Functional	Ireland	ESB ecars	46		50 kW CHAdeMO DC	2010	2014	
1 Functional	Ireland	ESB ecars	6		50 kW CCS DC	2010	2014	Existing CHAdeMO DC units are being upgraded to tri-standard DC/AC
2 Under Construction	Ireland	ESB ecars	500	Type 2 Mode 3	22 kW 3-Phase 230 V	2010	2014	
2 Under Construction	Ireland	ESB ecars	40		50 kW CCS DC	2010	2014	Existing CHAdeMO DC units are being upgraded to tri-standard DC/AC

In 2009–2010 the Irish Government, and electric utility Electricity Supply Board (ESB) entered into tripartite agreements with major electric vehicle manufacturers (Renault–Nissan , Mitsubishi Motors , Toyota , and PSA Peugeot Citroën) to promote the uptake of electric vehicles in Ireland.

The Irish government has instituted a package of measures, including a €5,000 grant (US$7,158) to assist with purchasing the vehicle, exemption from vehicle registration tax, and accelerated capital allowances to promote electric vehicle purchase. In 2013, the Irish government withdrew the EV vehicle registration tax exemption and replaced it with a €5,000 discount on the tax. New conditions were also added to the SEAI EV Grant which reclassified private EV purchases via Hire Purchase or car loan as a commercial purchase, effectively reducing the EV grant to €3,500 for all non-cash buyers. As a result of these changes, EV sales fell in 2013 to only 58 units.

ESB is providing the charging network, which will be made up of 46 fast-charging (50 kW DC) stations located at intervals on inter-urban national primary routes, 1,500 medium-speed(22 kW AC) public charging points distributed across all towns with population over 1500, and home chargers (3.6 kW 1Φ, 16A) at no cost to the first 2,000 grant qualifying electric car owners.

The first station of the charger network was commissioned in August 2010. At the end of 2011 the charging station map shows 50 AC charging places plus 10 DC stations – the AC chargers will be built to Type 2 sockets however some older charging spots still need to be rebuilt. As of 2014 all 46 CHAdeMO fast chargers are operational and are slowly being replaced by tri-standard units capable of CHAdeMO, CCS and 44 kW AC power.

Analysis of the charge station network as of 2016 showed that the installed network coverage was extensive but weak with respect to fault resilience.

==== Luxembourg ====
Status	Region	Provider	Number	Connector	FastCharge	Started	Updated	Comment
1 Functional	Luxembourg	Chargy	600	Type 2 Mode 3	up to 22 kW AC	2016	2021	Only 460 chargers are publicly accessible
2 Under Construction	Luxembourg	SuperChargy	88	Type 2 CCS	160 kW to 320 kW DC	2021	2021	

There is a national network of accelerated charging stations under the brand name of Chargy. A network of fast chargers is being constructed under the name of SuperChargy.

==== The Netherlands ====
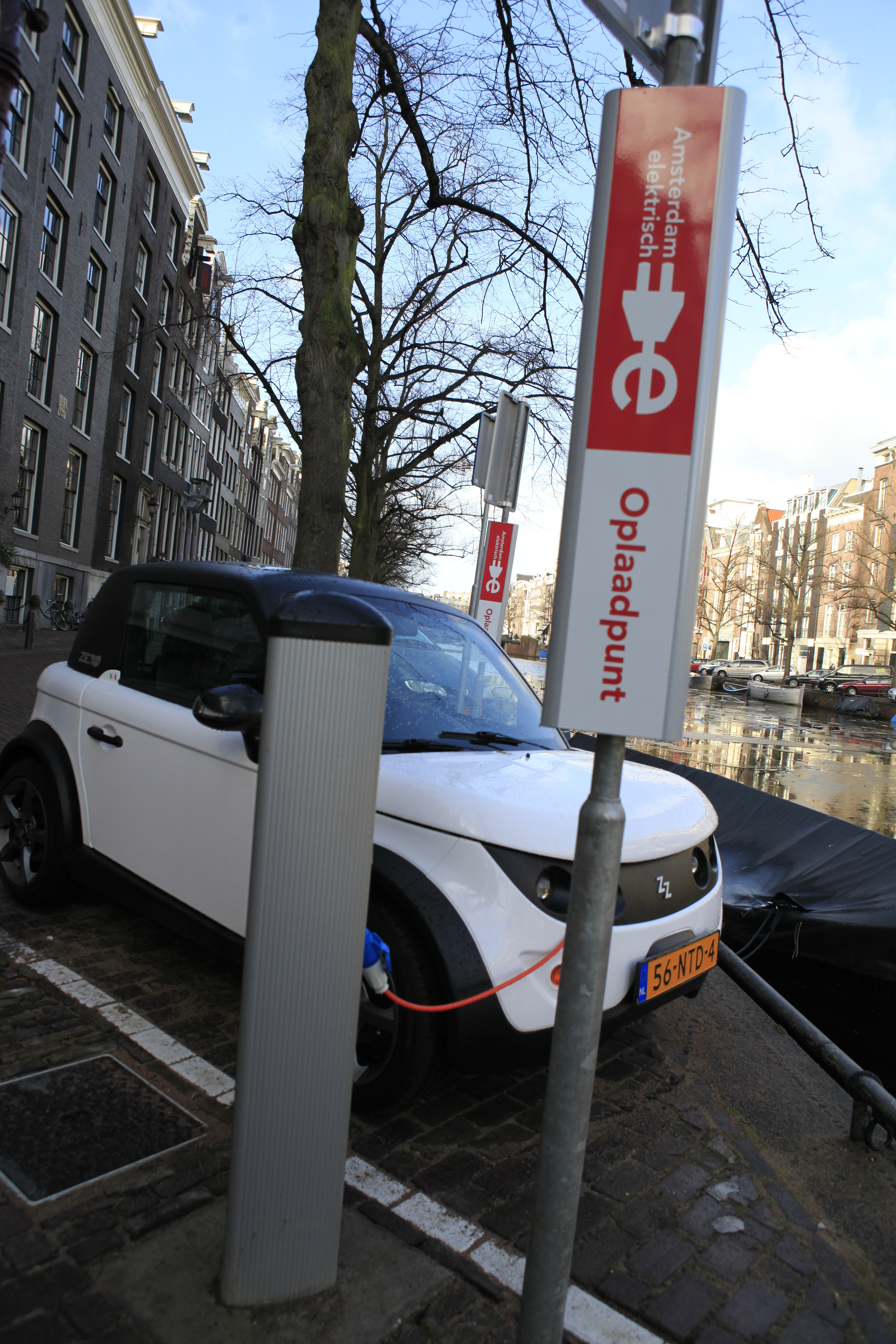
Charging station along a canal in Amsterdam

In 2009 the City of Amsterdam announced it will set up 200 charging stations by 2012. In the first step the city will put up 100 stations from Coulomb Technologies in cooperation with Dutch utility Nuon and grid company Alliander. The project "Amsterdam Elektrisch" project includes 100 street-side charging stations plus 100 charging stations at car parks The first one was put up on 6. November 2009, the 100th street-side charging station became operational on 4. March 2011, with also over 100 charging stations at car parks. In April 2011, the City of Amsterdam announced the expansion of the street-side charging network with another 1000 charging stations, to be installed by Essent and a joint venture of Nuon and Heijmans.

The Dutch government created the "Formula E Team," a working group collaborating with local governments, private companies and research institutes to create national and regional electric vehicle initiatives. The Foundation E-Laad.nl has the ambitious plan to put up 10,000 charging points by 2012. The Dutch government and the regional grid companies help Foundation E-laad.nl to put up a charging station network adding 65 million Euro investment support in the timeframe 2009 to 2011. The point of 500 charging stations (distributed over 125 communities) was reached on 24. June. The point of 1000 charging stations was reached on 8. December 2011, 1500 on 2. May 2012. and 2500 on 22. August 2013.

According to the roadmap of Formula E-Team the office has been created and the first RFI has started in August 2010; the results will be published in early November for comments and proposals with a definite guide for the infrastructure to be published in March 2011. The integration tests will run in mid of 2011 and the back office system for the networked charging stations to go live in late 2011 along with the "Charge Authority Board" for further development. On 19. July 2010 the Formula E-Team has resolved that charge points in the Netherlands will be equipped with Type 2 Mode 3 sockets, based on a decision by providers from 9. April 2010 that will replace the earlier 5-pin CEE red sockets.

The Netherlands is one of the first European markets for the Nissan Leaf; It is also the first European country to adopt stations for the "level 3" fast-charging supported by the Leaf. Epyon has unveiled the first charging station at a gasoline station in Leeuwarden, in the northern province of Friesland.

Year	Regular public charging points	Regular semi-public	Fast charging
2013	3512	2249	106
2014	5421	6439	254
2015	7395	10391	465
2016	11768	14320	612
2017	15288	17587	755
2018	20228	15633	1116
2019	27773	21747	1252
2020-05	32331	24527	1308
2020-06	33280	24954	1333
2020-07	34529	25406	1462

==== Poland ====
Status	Region	Provider	Number	Connector	FastCharge	Started	Updated	Comment
1 Functional	Warsaw	RWE	11	mains (230 V, 16 A)	Type 2 Mode 3 (400 V, 32 A)	2010		E-Mobility
2 Under Construction	Warsaw	GreenStream	130	CEE blue (230 V, 16 A)		2011		RWE
2 Under Construction	Zielona Gora	easyPoint	130					Ekoenergetyka-Zachod
3 Planned	Warsaw, Gdańsk, Katowice, Kraków, Mielec	GreenCars	330			2020		RWE

RWE and the "Green Stream Cluster" have started in June 2010 to put up a network of 130 charging stations in Warsaw. The Grean Stream Cluster project will run until mid of 2011. The Green Stream Cluster will put up overall 330 charging stations in five cities: Warsaw, Gdansk, Katowice, Kraków and Mielec. "Ekoenergetyka-Zachod" works on an electric vehicle network in the western cities of Zielona Gora (Grünberg), Sulechow, Pila (Schneidemühl) und Sieradz.

==== Portugal ====
Status	Region	Provider	Number	Connector	FastCharge	Started	Updated	Comment
1 Functional	Portugal	MOBI.E	100			2010		
2 Under Construction	Portugal	MOBI.E	1300		50x	2011		coop. Renault–Nissan

Renault–Nissan have signed a contract with MOBIE.Tech that was started back in 2008. There shall be 1300 new charging stations and 50 fastcharge stations within the 2011 timeframe.

The government wants to enlarge to renewable energy sector up to 60% and usage of electric vehicles is considered an important strategy to cut dependency on imports. The MOBI.E network has installed 100 charging stations and it is deploying 1300 charging stations as well as 50 fast-charge stations in 25 cities up to June 2011. The MOBI.E stations work with magnetic stripe card and bills are sent to the cell phone – the government hopes to export the concept to other countries.

==== Slovenia ====
Status	Region	Provider	Number	Connector	FastCharge	Started	Updated	Comment
1 Functional	Ljubljana	municipal utilities	22	Schuko (16 A, 230 V)	Type 2 /32 A	2012		elektro crpalke

An overview of available charging stations is provided by polni.si, the biggest providers are Dravske Elektrarne Maribor, Elektro Celje, Elektro Gorenjska, Elektro Ljubljana, Elektro Maribor, Elektro Primorska and Petrol. The municipal works Elektro Ljubljana provides a number of public charging stations in the elektro-crpalke network based on 400 V/32 A type or the domestic socket type (Schuko).

==== Spain ====
Status	Region	Provider	Number	Connector	FastCharge	Started	Updated	Comment
1 Functional	Barcelona	Endesa	55	Schuko (16 A, 230 V)		2010		Live Barcelona
1 Functional	Galicia		14+7	Mode 3 IEC 62196 Type 2 (16 A, 230 V)	Chademo	2011		BlueMobility for the Plan Mobega
2 Under Construction	Barcelona	Endesa	191	Schuko (16 A, 230 V)		2012		MOVELE
2 Under Construction		Endesa			53x Chademo	2012		
2 Under Construction	Madrid	Telefónica	30			2011		MOVELE
3 Planned	Sevilla, Madrid, Barcelona	Endesa	546	Schuko (16 A, 230 V)		2014		MOVELE

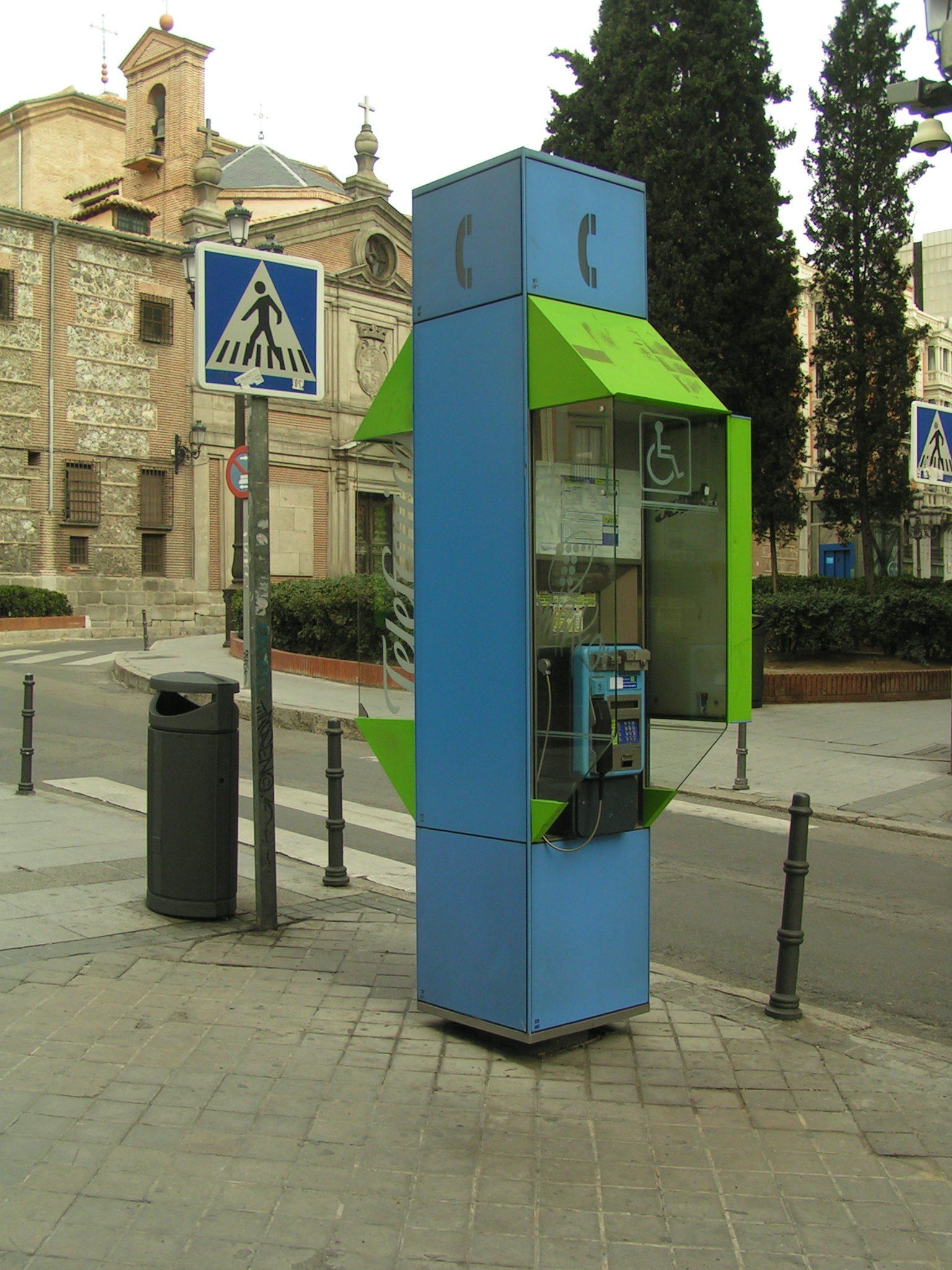
Telefónica phone booths are offering EV recharging

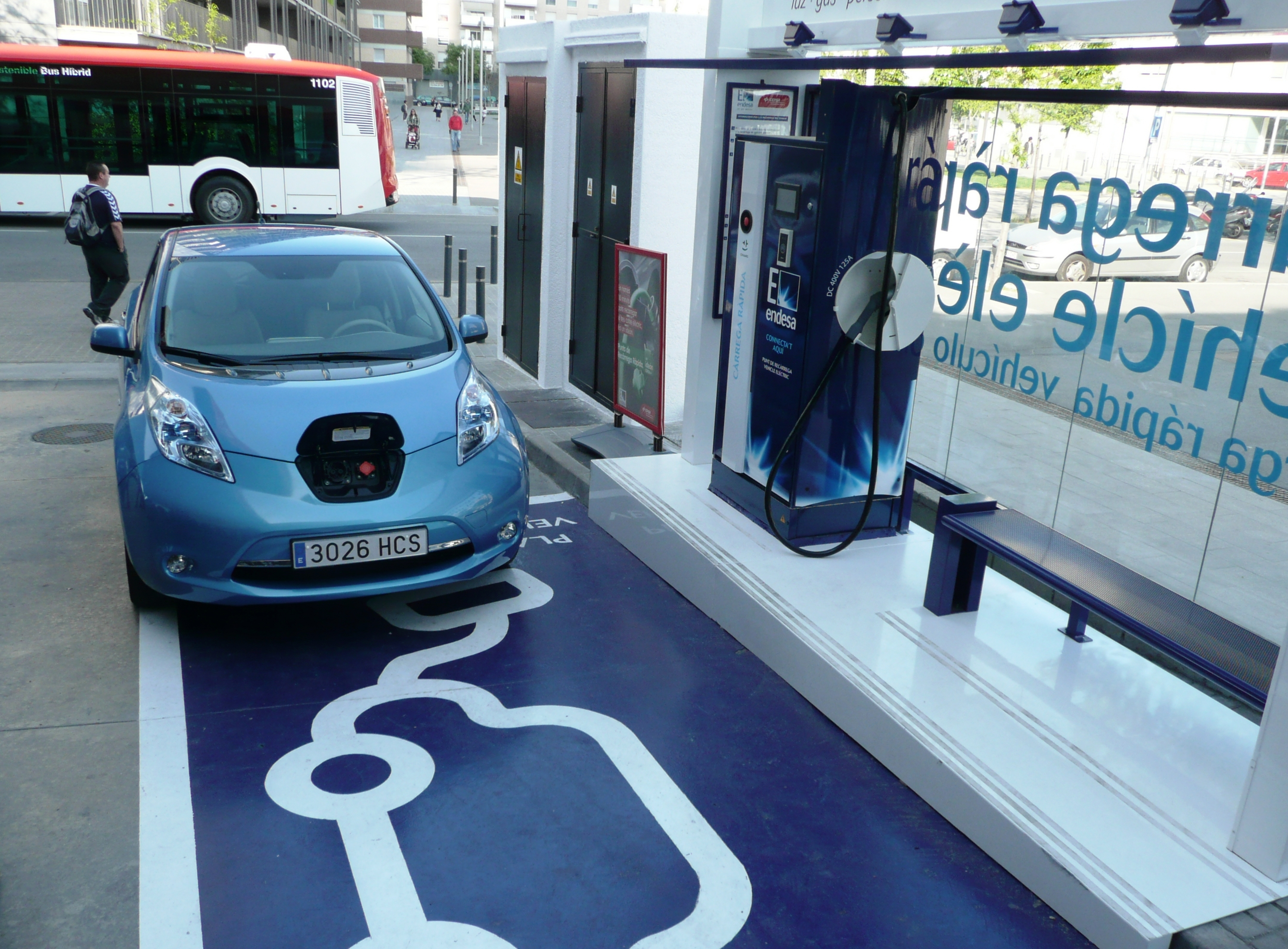
Charging station of Endesa in Barcelona 2011

In Madrid, Spain, a trial project will convert 30 former telephone boxes into charging points for electric cars. They are considered suitable, since telephone boxes are generally located at the roadside and are already connected to the electricity supply network. They would form part of a planned network of 546 charging points in Madrid, Barcelona and Seville, subsidised by the Spanish Government. The charging grid is created for the MOVELE pilot project of the Institute for Diversification and Saving of Energy (Instituto para la Diversificación y Ahorro de la Energía, IDAE) that is also providing for 2,000 electric vehicles to the field test. The Spanish government has committed itself to have 1 million electric vehicles (fully electric and hybrid cars) in Spain by 2014.

MOVELE network	Sevilla	Madrid	Barcelona	TOTAL
charging points	75	280	191	546
station costs (€)	488,498	1,366,000	704,666	2,559,164
IDAE funding	144,000	586,000	287,000	1,017,000

The Chairman of Endesa, Borja Prado, together with a former mayor of Madrid, Alberto Ruiz Gallardón, and the Chairman of Telefónica, César Alierta, have the phone booth in Madrid which can also be used for recharging electric vehicles. Reserved parking spaces will be located next to this and all other booths set up in Metropolitan areas where users will be able to park their EVs and recharge at no cost once they have obtained their free "zero emissions" pre-paid card from the Madrid city council.

The "Live Barcelona" map (sponsored by the Barcelona city council, the Energy state department of Catalonia, utility Endesa, car maker Seat) lists 138 charging spots in Barcelona with 55 of them functional (February 2011).

In September 2011 Endesa signed agreements with Mitsubishi, Renault–Nissan and the Japanese Chademo Foundation on the promotion of fast-charge stations. Endesa will hold the Chademo Europe chair. As a consequence, Endesa will deploy two types of public charging spots – conventional charging (16 A, 230 V AC, Schuko type) and rapid charging (125 A, 400 V DC, Chademo type). In October 2011 Endesa ordered 53 rapid charging stations to be built by GE in strategic places in Spain.

The Galicia region is creating a research cluster (Clúster de Empresas de Automoción de Galicia / Ceaga). The infrastructure side (Plan Mobega – Plan de movilidad eléctrica de Galicia) includes the implementation of a network of multifunctional electromobility stations located at rent-a-car stations. The current installation includes 7 Multifunctional Electromobility stations which are located in the main metropolitan areas of Galicia and a fleet of 28 electric vehicles. The project was started in September 2011 and will continue until Enero 2013.

==== United Kingdom ====
Status	Region	Provider	Number	Connector	FastCharge	Started	Updated	Comment
1 Functional	UK	Osprey Charging	250		Type 2 and CHAdeMO (50 kW, DC) CCS (50 kW-175 kW, DC)	2016	2021	High-power rapid charging
1 Functional	England North East	Elektromotive	400	BS 1363 (230 V 13 A)		2010	2012	One NorthEast
1 Functional	England Other	Elektromotive	287	BS 1363 (230 V 13 A)		2007	2011	
1 Functional	Scotland	Elektromotive	120	BS 1363 (230 V 13 A)		2010	2012	
1 Functional	England	Zero Carbon World	166	BS 1363 (230 V 13 A)	CEE blue (230 V 32 A) and Type 2 Mode 3 (230 V, 32 A)	2010	2012	High power and free to use
1 Functional	London	Siemens	1300	BS 1363 (230 V 13 A)	(230 V, 32 A)	2011	2013	Source London
1 Functional	UK	Ecotricity, network since taken over by Gridserve	544		Type 2 Mode 3 (480 V, 32 A 3 phase) and CHAdeMO (50-100 kW, DC) CCS (50-350 kW, DC)	2011	2022	Rapid charging located at Motorway service area's to allow inter-city travel
1 Functional	UK	BP Pulse	778		Type 2 Mode 3 (480 V, 32-63 A 3 phase) and CHAdeMO (50-100 kW, DC) CCS (50-150 kW, DC)	2008	2022	Nationwide charging network, formerly known as Polar, taken over by BP.
1 Functional	UK	Gridserve	300		CHAdeMO (50-100 kW, DC) CCS (50-350 kW, DC)	2017	2022	Rapid charging located at UK Motorway Service Areas
1 Functional	UK	Instavolt	683		CHAdeMO (50-100 kW, DC) CCS (50-350 kW, DC)	2016	2022	Rapid charging located at shopping centres, pubs, cafes, restaurants
2 Under Construction		Elektromotive	4000	BS 1363 (230 V 13 A)		2012		
2 Under Construction	Scotland	(funding program)	44		Type 2 Mode 3 (230 V, 32 A), Type 2 Mode 3 (400 V, 32 A) and CHAdeMO (70 kW or 50 kW, DC)	2012	2013	"Plugged-In Places" grant with deadline 31 March 2013
3 Planned	London, North-East		2500			2012		plus 11,000 private stations
3 Planned	London		2500			2015		plus 22,000 private stations
3 Planned	Central Scotland, the East of England, Greater Manchester, Milton Keynes, the North East of England, Northern Ireland	(funding program)	8500			2015		"Plugged-In Places" counting home, work and public charging stations
3 Planned		Zero Carbon World	1000	BS 1363 (230 V 13 A)	Type 2 Mode 3 (230 V, 32 A)	2012		donation program

Électricité de France is partnering with Elektromotive, Ltd. to install 250 new charging points over six months from October 2007 in London and elsewhere in the UK. By November 2011 there are 687 Electrobay charging stations (200 in London) and it plans to build 4000 charging points throughout 2012. Elektromotive has provided 400 public access charge points to the "Charge your Car" network of One NorthEast in 2010 and it has installed more than 120 charge points across Scotland. The Scottish Government funded network, ChargePlace Scotland, was transferred to operate under SWARCO (a Swarovski company brand) since 2021 following a competitive tender.

The Renault–Nissan Alliance and UK company Elektromotive, a provider of electric vehicle recharging stations, are collaborating in the Partnership for Zero-Emission-Mobility, with the aim of accelerating the installation of charging networks for plug-in vehicles in cities. The Alliance and Elektromotive have signed a Memorandum of Understanding.

A fleet of electric cars and charge points will be rolled out across Coventry (England) as part of a multimillion-pound pilot project.

The Department for Transport (DfT) announced in April 2009 that £230 million would be allocated to incentivise the market uptake of EVs in the UK. The scheme will become operational in 2011 and each EV purchaser could receive a rebate of between £2,000 -£5,000. Electric vehicles are exempt from purchase and annual vehicle tax. From April 2010, purchasers of an average new car (Band G) will pay a one off £155 showroom tax and an annual vehicle tax of £155.EVs are tax free.

On 25 February 2010, London, the North East region and Milton Keynes were selected to be the lead places for electric vehicle infrastructure. In total, their plans will result in over 2,500 charge points in the first year and over 11,000 in the next three years, at a variety of publicly accessible car parks, transport hubs and workplaces.

The London mayor called for an E-revolution in March 2009 and he presented the "Electric Delivery Plan for London" in May 2009. The plan projects 25,000 charging points London by 2015 including 500 on-street, 2000 off-street in car-parks and 22,000 privately owned locations. London itself will buy 1000 electric vehicles up to 2015. Owners of an electric car will not need to pay the Congestion Charge for the city of London being worth up to £1,700 a year. At that point (May 2009) London already had 100 charge points in public places which will be increased to 250 by 2012. Beginning 2011 20% of new lots in car parks must have access to a charging outlet. Additionally, the parking in the Westminster boroughs will be free for electric vehicles saving the user up to £6,000 a year and a flat rate of £200 electricity cost is charged for the usage of public outlets in Westminster.

As of February 2011 the "Source London" project has contracted Siemens to build a network of public charging stations in London. At least 1,300 charging points will be installed by the end of 2013 in public locations and streets across the Capital. Transport for London (TfL) has also finalised a contract that will see Siemens manage the operation of the network and registration of drivers. The deal between TfL and Siemens will see Siemens run the Source London back office to March 2014 at no cost. Up to July 2011 there were 180 charging stations. and in November 2011 more than 200. The number of charging stations reached 790 in October 2012 with plans to increase that to 1300 in 2013. The goal of 1300 publicly accessible charging stations was met on 16 May 2013.

In July 2011 a charity called Zero Carbon World announced their Charge Points Everywhere network, their aim is to help business's install free to use charge points on their business's with the implicit understanding the person using the charge point will use the services of that business. The connections themselves are standard 32 and 13amp connectors and the inclusion of the 32amp connector means that car with powerful chargers such as Tesla can charge much faster than with the 13a connectors on the majority of chargers On 15 February 2012, the alliance announce to donate 1000 charging stations for free adding up on the existing 76 charging stations that are already deployed.

The "Plugged-In Places" program of the Department of Transport offers grants for charging station networks in the United Kingdom. The development plan identifies 8 regions to be in a strategic focus – Central Scotland, the East of England, Greater Manchester, Milton Keynes, the North East of England and Northern Ireland – with a target of 8500 chargepoints. Following the ACEA position paper the government program favours moving to a dedicated recharging connector of Type 2 Mode 3. Referring to the PIP program an open tender in Newcastle upon Tyne identifies the goal to have 75% of the charging stations to offer Type 2 Mode 3 sockets including to switch over existing charging stations to that type.

The UK has limited electric vehicle charging network roaming providers. Paua and AllStar provides this service for businesses.

=== Middle East ===
==== Israel ====
Status	Region	Provider	Number	Connector	FastCharge	Started	Updated	Comment
1 Functional	Tel Aviv	~~BetterPlace~~	1			2010		BetterPlace demo center
1 Functional	Israel	Gnrgy	4			2011		
2 Under Construction	Israel	~~BetterPlace~~	200			2011		behind time
2 Under Construction	Israel	Gnrgy	25			2011		
3 Planned	Israel	~~BetterPlace~~	400	and 40 swap stations		2011		coop. Renault
3 Planned	Israel	Gnrgy	500			2012		
4 Proposed	Israel	~~BetterPlace~~	220			2011		coop. Israel Railways

Israel has enacted policies that create a tax differential between zero-emission vehicles and traditional cars, to accelerate the transition to electric cars.

Better Place began to build its first electric vehicle network in Israel in conjunction with French car-maker, Renault. The company conducted its first market tests in Israel, Denmark and Hawaii because their small size also made them suitable as test markets. Better Place opened its first functional charging station in Israel the first week of December 2008 at Cinema City in Pi-Glilot, and additional stations were planned in Tel Aviv, Haifa, Kfar Saba, Holon, and Jerusalem.

In March 2011 Better Place presented a detailed plan for network construction, including 40 battery swap stations and 400 charging stations across Israel. A total of 200 locations were said to be under construction or planned at the end of 2011, but that goal was not reached. On 26 May 2013, Better Place filed for bankruptcy in Israel, having terminated its projects in most markets.

Gnrgy, originally a producer of mobile charging solutions, entered the market as an alternative to Betterplace. On 29 February 2012 it partnered with Pango, provider of parking billing solutions, to set up a series of charging stations throughout Israel.

=== North America ===
==== Canada ====
Status	Region	Provider	Number	Connector	FastCharge	Started	Updated	Comment
1 Functional	National	Sun Country Highway	1000	varies	No	2012		Includes entire length of the Trans-Canada Highway main route.
1 Functional	National	FLO	2,127	SAE J1772	50 kW CCS, CHAdeMO	2011	2020	Members can access chargers of The Electric Circuit and eCharge, BC Hydro EV, ChargePoint networks
1 Functional	Quebec	The Electric Circuit	2,389	SAE J1772	50 kW CCS, CHAdeMO	2012	2020	Members can access chargers of FLO and eCharge networks
1 Functional	British Columbia	BC Hydro EV	60	CHAdeMO	yes	2011	2016	New stations will be dual-standard CHAdeMO/CCS; existing ones will be upgraded
1 Functional	Vancouver	City of Vancouver	78	SAE J1772	1 station	2011	2016	1 CHAdeMO charger installed at Empire Fields
1 Functional	New Brunswick	eCharge	79	SAE J1772	50 kW CCS, CHAdeMO	2017	2020	Members can access chargers of the FLO and The Electric Circuit networks

In 2012, a series of free public electric vehicle charging stations were installed along the main route of the Trans-Canada Highway by a private company, Sun Country Highway, permitting electric vehicle travel across the entire length, as demonstrated by the company's president in a publicity trip in a Tesla Roadster. As of 2012 this made it the longest electric vehicle ready highway in the world. The same company also partnered with Canadian rural hardware retailer Peavey Mart to add free public charging stations to its 29 stores across Western Canada and includes chargers located at Best Western hotels in Canada and the US on its online map of EV charging stations. As of 2013 the company's total network was over 700 chargers with plans to reach 1000 chargers by year end.

From 2011 to 2014, the City of Vancouver installed publicly accessible Level 2 charging stations in a variety of locations, including community centres, shopping malls, curbside, and other locations throughout the city. In 2008, the city changed the Building Bylaw to require 20% of parking stalls in apartments and condos, and all stalls in houses to be electric vehicle ready. In 2013, the bylaw was updated so that 10% of stalls in mixed-use and commercial buildings are also ready for electric vehicles.

In a March 2016 news release, the Government of British Columbia stated that the CEV Program investments have supported over 550 public Level 2 charging stations, and 30 DC fast charging stations.

==== United States ====
Status	Region	Provider	Number	Connector	FastCharge	Started	Updated	Comment
1 Functional	U.S. Alternative Fuels Data Center Summary		7902			1992	April; 2014	USA wide
1 Functional	Nationwide	Tesla	9,233	Tesla	63-250 kW	2010	Nov 2020	In 933 stations.
1 Functional	Nationwide	Electrify America						
1 Functional	Portland	Portland G. Electric	20	SAE J1772		2008	2010	
1 Functional	California, Seattle, Texas, Florida, Maryland, Virginia, Georgia, Hawaii, Washington, D.C	SemaConnect		SAE J1772	Level-II (240 V 30 A)	2010	2014	SemaConnect
1 Functional	California	ChargePoint	580	SAE J1772	Level-II (240 V 30 A)	2010	2012	Coulomb Tech
1 Functional	Washington State	ChargePoint	237	SAE J1772	Level-II (240 V 30 A)	2011	2012	Coulomb Tech
1 Functional	Chicago Area	JNS Power	350	SAE J1772	Level-II (240 V 30 A)	2011	2012	Coulomb Tech
1 Functional	Boston	ChargePoint	108	SAE J1772	Level-II (240 V 30 A)	2011	2012	Coulomb Tech
1 Functional	New York / New Jersey	ChargePoint	128	SAE J1772	Level-II (240 V 30 A)	2011	2012	Coulomb Tech
1 Functional	Washington DC / Baltimore	ChargePoint	164	SAE J1772	Level-II (240 V 30 A)	2011	2012	Coulomb Tech
1 Functional	Florida	ChargePoint	275	SAE J1772	Level-II (240 V 30 A)	2011	2012	Coulomb Tech
1 Functional	San Antonio / Houston	ChargePoint	261	SAE J1772	Level-II (240 V 30 A)	2011	2012	Coulomb Tech
1 Functional	San Diego	EV Project	261	SAE J1772	Level-II (240 V)	2012		ECOtality
1 Functional	Seattle	EV Project	407	SAE J1772	Level-II (240 V)	2012		ECOtality
1 Functional	Houston	EV Project	177	SAE J1772	Level-II (240 V)	2012		ECOtality
1 Functional	Tennessee	EV Project	365	SAE J1772	Level-II (240 V)	2012		ECOtality
1 Functional	South Carolina	EATON	100	SAE J1772	(some of them)	2010		state program
1 Functional	Dallas/Houston	EVgo	15	SAE J1772		2010		EVgo
1 Functional	Hawaii	BetterPlace	140/200			2011	2012	DEBDT program
2 Under Construction	SF Bay Area		109			2010		California ARB
2 Under Construction	San Diego	EV Project	1500	SAE J1772 (220 V)		2012		ECOtality
2 Under Construction	Texas	EVgo	50	SAE J1772		2010		EVgo
2 Under Construction	California	EVgo	200	SAE J1772		2012		EVgo
2 Under Construction	Detroit, New York, Wash.DC, California, Washington, Austin	ChargePoint	4600*	SAE J1772	(optional)	2011	2012	Coulomb Tech
3 Planned	San Diego, Arizona, Seattle, Oregon, Tennessee, Dallas	EV Project	6350	SAE J1772 (220 V)	310x Level-3 DC	2012Q4		ECOtality
3 Out of service	California, Arizona	GM EV1	500	mains (110 V)	MagneCharge (220 V, 30 A)	1996	2001	program cancelled

Infrastructure has been installed by Coulomb Technologies in Arizona; California – San Francisco, San Jose, Walnut Creek, and Sonoma; Colorado; Washington, D.C.; Florida; Chicago, Illinois; Massachusetts; Detroit, Michigan; Minneapolis, Minnesota; New York City; Cary, North Carolina; Ohio; Portland, Oregon; Nashville, Tennessee; Texas; Seattle, Washington; Wisconsin. Gilbarco Veeder-Root are partnering with Coulomb to advance public charging facilities. Gilbarco exhibited Coulomb Technologies' Smartlet Charging Station at the National Association of Convenience Stores (NACS) show in October 2008. At the end of 2008, Coulomb Technologies planned to roll out five curbside charging stations in downtown San Jose that drivers can access through a prepaid plan. The company was working with entities in Las Vegas Nevada, New York and Florida to do something similar there. Coulomb Technologies has announced to provide 1000 free public charging stations until December 2010. They also plan to expand its "ChargePoint America network" to 4600 free home and public level-2 charging stations until October 2011 in nine regions: Austin, Texas; Detroit, Michigan; Los Angeles, California; New York, New York; Orlando, Florida; Sacramento, California; the San Jose/San Francisco Bay Area, California; Redmond, Washington; and Washington DC. The $37 million ChargePoint America program is made possible by a $15M grant funded by the American Recovery and Reinvestment Act through the Transportation Electrification Initiative administered by the Department of Energy. So far 149 stations are operational according to the ChargePoint map, 51 stations are in California. New York joins the ChargePoint network building more than 100 charging stations in public places until October 2011. In April 2012 the first milestone of the Chargepoint America program has been reached with Colulomb Technologies having delivered 2400 public and commercial charging stations, the actual installation of its Level 2 (240 V 30 A) stations in the 10 participating regions will continue.

Infrastructure is planned by Better Place for Hawaii, Oregon, and California – the San Francisco Bay area, Sacramento, San Jose, Los Angeles, San Diego, and the highway and freeway corridors between them.

Other companies that are building charging stations throughout the U.S. are ECOtality and SolarCity

In the initial phase of "The EV Project" of ECOtality there are 11 participating cities: Phoenix (AZ), Tucson (AZ), San Diego (CA), Portland (OR), Eugene (OR), Salem (OR), Corvallis (OR), Seattle (WA), Nashville (TN), Knoxville (TN) and Chattanooga (TN). The contract for the "EV Project" was signed on 1 October 2009, with the US Department of Energy and it includes 8,300 Level 2 chargers installed in owner's homes; 6,350 Level 2 chargers installed in commercial and public locations; and 310 Level 3 DC fast-chargers. The EV project will run for 36 months. The public charging stations will be put up beginning in summer 2010. Texas has joined the EV Project in July 2010. San Diego will take a share of 1,500 public charging stations and 1,000 home base charging points. The first milestone of The EV Project has been reached in April 2012.

Portland General Electric installs 12 electric vehicle charging stations in Portland and Salem, Oregon until September 2008 and it has installed 20 charging stations by 2010 as part of a demonstration project to develop the transportation infrastructure needed to support electric vehicles and plug-in cars.

NRG Energy has announced to create a network of 50 charging stations in northern Texas under the "EVgo" brand. In March 2012 the company announced to build a network of 200 fast-charging stations in California over the next four years. By 30 Dec. 2015 EVgo has installed over 1,000 chargers in over 25 markets. NRG EVgo has developed partnerships to build infrastructure and offer complimentary charging with Nissan, BMW and Ford.

In Virginia, with the participation of the Town of Wytheville, and several businesses, Plugless Power inductive charging stations began field testing in March 2010. South Carolina has unveiled its "Plug in Carolina" program including 100 public charging stations in December 2010 In San Antonio, TX, a downtown church (Travis Park United Methodist Church) made Level 1 charging available in its parking lot in 2009.

The DBEDT ministry of Hawaii had a state rebate program "EV Ready Grant" that was funded by the American Recovery and Reinvestment Act – the program was offering $4500 for a full-speed commercially available electric vehicle and $500 for electric vehicle chargers. The "EV Ready Grant" program is followed by the "EV Ready Rebate" program offering 20% of the purchase price with a maximum of $4500 for a full-speed commercially available electric vehicle and 30% of the purchase prices with a maximum of $500 for electric vehicle chargers. Charging equipment is expected follow the standards including SAE J1772. The designated Transportation Working Group expects 200 charging stations to be available in 2010 In February 2012 it was announced to have Betterplace activate its multi-island network of 130 charging stations (Oahu, Maui, Kauai and the Big Island). The Hawaii rebate program is being continued with having reached a score of 372 funded vehicles and 246 chargers, and by April 2012 approximately 220 charging stations have been installed as part of the EV Ready Grant Program. The Hawaii station database lists the 200 public charging stations in 80 locations that were available up to March 2012, about 140 have been installed by BetterPlace.

In California the car maker Tesla has put up 18 public charging stations. Within the SF Bay Area Activities & Coalition has identified 109 locations to put up public charging stations beginning 2009 based on funding by ARRA. The last California "ZEV Program Review symposium" was held on 23. September 2009, the next one is scheduled for late summer 2010. In the past there had been a charging station network to support the General Motors EV1 that had installed 500 public charging station.

The U.S. Department of Energy offers a list of locations of the available alternative fuel infrastructure. The historic trend summary (1992–2010) shows a total of 541 electric charging locations by 2010 which had been still lower than the peak count of 873 charging locations in 2002. As of November 2020 the total count of public electric charge stations in the United States had increased to 27,458.

Electrify America operates one of the largest public electric vehicle DC fast charging networks in the United States, with more than 500 charging locations and over 2,200 individual charging units, as of 2020. The company expects to install or have under development approximately 800 stations with about 3,500 DC fast chargers by December 2021.

=== Oceania ===
==== Australia ====
Status	Region	Provider	Number	Connector	FastCharge	Started	Updated	Comment
1 Functional	Melbourne, Canberra, Sydney	ChargePoint	20	AS 3112 (230 V, 15 A)	SAE J1772 (230 V 32 A)	2010	2012	1 additional non-public demo station
1 Functional	Brisbane, Townsville, Adelaide, Perth	ChargePoint	16		SAE J1772	2011	2012	
1 Functional	Perth	(project foundation)	23		Type 2 Mode 3 (415 V 32 A) (240 V 32 A)	2010	2012	REV Project (University of Western Australia)
1 Functional	Melbourne	ECOtality+Exigency	1	AS 3112 (230 V, 15 A)	SAE J1772	2010		140 William St car park
3 Planned	Melbourne-Sydney-Brisbane highway corridor	Tesla Motors	~16			2014	2016	
4 Proposed	Melbourne, Sydney, Canberra, Newcastle	~~BetterPlace~~	20	SAE J1772		2012	2013	

Australia currently has thirteen electric vehicle charging stations across Sydney, Melbourne and Canberra from Coulomb Technologies. They opened in 2010 and 2011. One charge point from ECOtality has been installed in the car park at 140 William Street in Melbourne CBD with Exigency providing project management and metering. ChargePoint has expanded its service to eight cities by 2012 (Perth 3, Adelaide 5, Melbourne 10, Canberra 2, Sydney 8, Brisbane 6, Townsville 3, Hobart 1).

Construction of infrastructure (charging spots and battery switching stations) had been proposed by Better Place for the major cities Melbourne, Sydney and Brisbane. Australia would have become the third country in the world to have an electric car network in a bid to run the country's 15 million cars on batteries powered by green energy under a plan announced in October 2008. Better Place filed for bankruptcy in Israel on 25 May, shortly after pulling out of Australia. The original plan to deploy as much as 200,000 charging stations was stopped in January 2013, after just 20 public charge spots had been installed.

In May 2011 CO2 Smart has completed a fast recharge network in test city Perth. Electromotive has provided 11 dual-headed IEC-compatible fast-charge stations at 32A to be used with the CO2 Smart of the test fleet. In the test drive the European connectors have been preferred over the American connectors since Australia (like Europe) does have three-phase power (at 415 V) in most home locations. The fast-charge outlets connect with a special 8-pin IEC-compatible round connector integrating single-phase and three-phase power The project of the University of Western Australia was continued with 23 public charging stations available by September 2012 featuring Type 2 connectors at 32 A.

United States EV manufacturer Tesla Motors formally launched in Australia in December 2014, announcing their intention to build their supercharger network along the highway between Melbourne, Canberra and Sydney by the end of 2015, and extending to Brisbane by the end of 2016.

=== South America ===
==== Brazil ====
As of 2022, Brazil had around 1,250 stations, with 47% stations concentrated in the state of São Paulo

==== Uruguay ====
In January 2016, UTE opened the first charging station in Montevideo, exclusive for taxis.

In December 2017, UTE and Ancap opened a charging station network that connects Colonia del Sacramento, Rosario, Puntas de Valdez, Montevideo, San Luis and Punta del Este, with stations every 65 km. The stations at the Carrasco Airport and Colonia have 43 kW, whereas the other stations have 22 kW.

== See also ==
- Better Place
- Charging station
- Coulomb Technologies
- SemaConnect
- Tesla Supercharger
- Tritium
