= Elmacken =

Swedish EV charging network

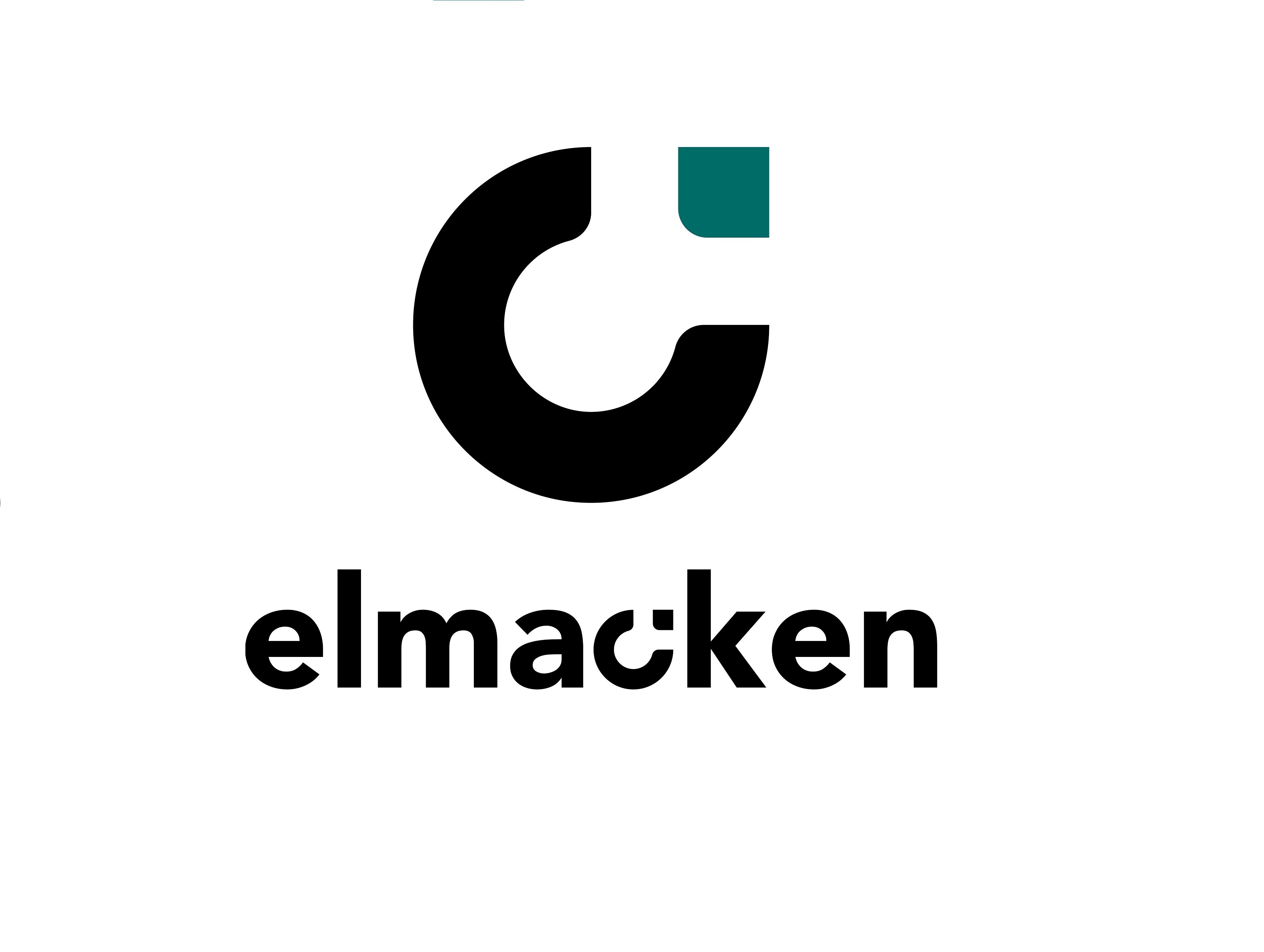

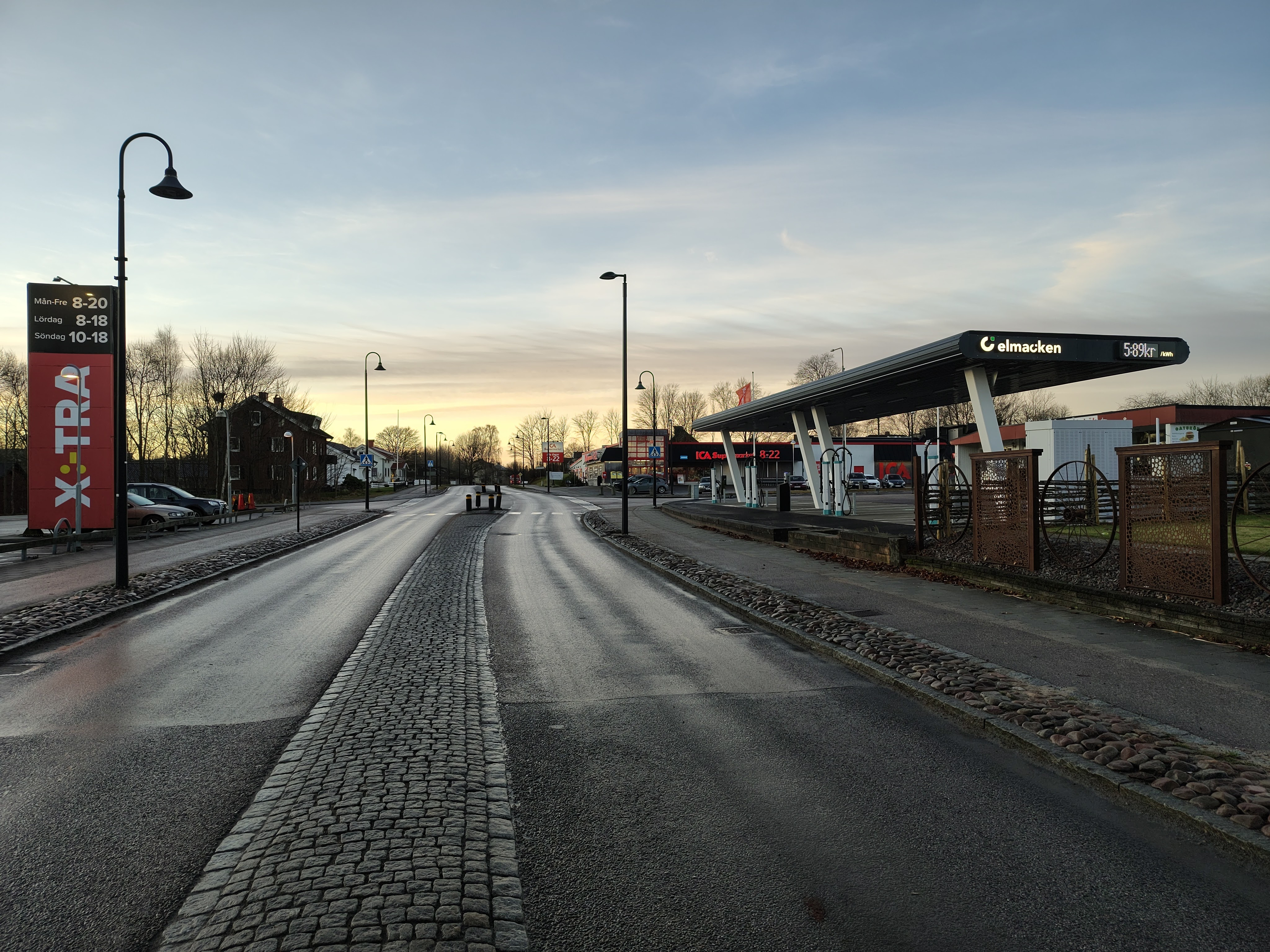
- Charging station in Smålandsstenar
- Industry: Charging networks
- Headquarters: Gislaved, Sweden
- Services: Rapid charging

Elmacken is a Swedish electric vehicle charging network based in Småland. The chain's two largest charging stations are located in central Smålandsstenar and Gislaved, in the Smålandia shopping area.

Elmacken's stations require no membership or app requirements. Payment can be made by bank card or Swish. Sweden's electricity area 3

== Charging stations ==
=== Gislaved ===
Charging station Gislaved was inaugurated in May of 2022. It is located in the Smålandia commercial area where road 26 and road 27 intersect. The station is equipped with 8 units of 150 kW Kempower CCS fast chargers.

=== Smålandsstenar ===
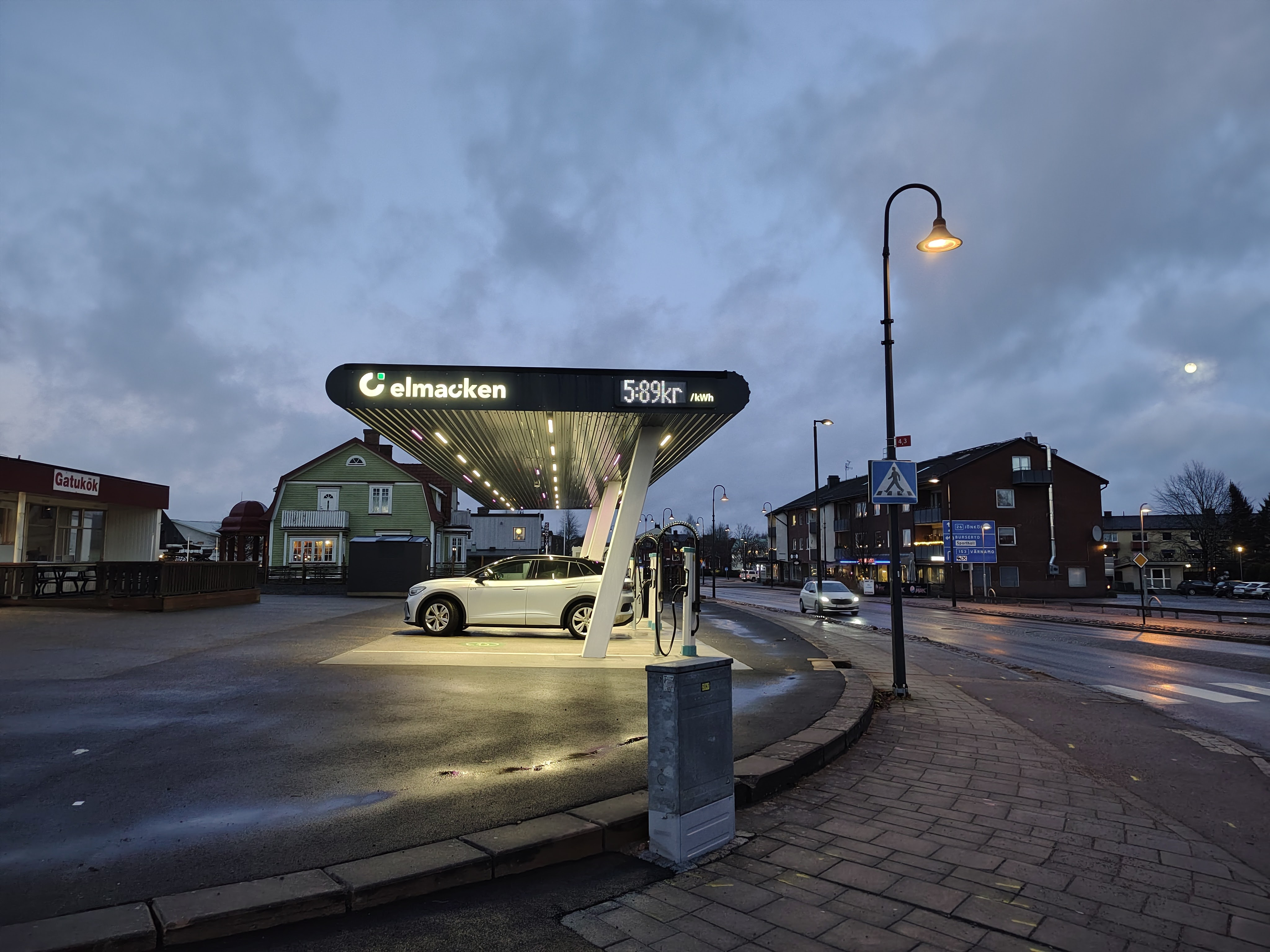
Charging station in Smålandsstenar

The charging station in Smålandsstenar was opened in August of 2024. The station is equipped with 6 units of 400 kW CCS fast chargers.

== In media ==
Elmacken's founders have been interviewed in Swedish trade magazines on various topics related to EVs - winter charging, costs, charging station operations, Chinese EV manufacturers, EV challenges and others. Elmacken has also been interviewed in several podcasts about EVs, available on Acast and Spotify.
