= Essent =

Dutch energy company

Essent N.V.
- Company type: Naamloze vennootschap
- Industry: Electricity
- Predecessors: PNEM/MEGA Groep; EDON Groep
- Founded: 1999; 27 years ago
- Headquarters: Den Bosch, Netherlands
- Key people: Patrick Lammers (CEO)
- Parent: E.ON
- Website: www.essent.nl

Essent N.V. is a Dutch energy company based in 's-Hertogenbosch, Netherlands. It is a subsidiary of E.ON. It is a public limited liability corporation. Essent is the largest energy company in the country. Belgium is their second home market. Essent provides customers with gas, electricity, heat and energy services. Essent (including its predecessors) has over 90 years of experience with generating, trading, transmitting and supplying electricity.

Essent has 2.3 million customers for electricity and about 2 million for gas.

== History ==
Logo as of 2005

Essent was formed in 1999 by the merger of PNEM/MEGA Groep and EDON Groep, energy groups based in the south and north of the Netherlands, respectively. PNEM/MEGA was created in 1997 by a merger between PNEM and Mega Limburg. EDON was a result of a merger between NV Energiebedrijf IJsselmij and EGD (Energiebedrijf Groningen Drenthe). In 2005, Nutsbedrijven Maastricht merged with Essent. The name Essent was developed by Globrands Naming & Strategy.

In 2000, Essent acquired a 51% stake in German utility Stadtwerke Bremen AG which at the same year made an offer for a 49.9% stake in another German utility Stadtwerke Bielefeld. In 2007, Essent divested its cable division Kabelcom to the investment companies Cinven and Warburg Pincus. At the same year, Essent acquired Westland Energie Services. Also in 2007, Essent planned a merger with another Dutch energy company Nuon Energy, but the proposed merger was cancelled.

In 2009, the transmission network was unbundled from Essent. In January 2009, German energy major, RWE AG, announced its intention to buy out all outstanding and issued shares of Essent. The deal, valued to be around 9.3 billion euros, would make Essent an operating company of RWE in the Netherlands and Belgium. On 30 September 2009, the deal was closed. Until 1 October 2009, the shares of Essent were owned by six Dutch provinces of Overijssel (18%), Groningen (6%), North Brabant (30.8%), Drenthe (2.3%), Flevoland (0.02%) and Limburg (16%) and by more than 100 municipalities in these provinces and in the province of Friesland (the remaining 26%).

Since the split of RWE and Innogy as of 1 April 2016, the power generation business was transferred to RWE Generation NL B.V., while Essent as retail and renewable energy company remained in the Innogy group. Innogy has been purchased on 18 September 2019 by E.ON. As a consequence Essent is a consolidated part of E.ON.

== Achievements ==
In 2010 Essent opened the first commercial fast-charge station for electric vehicles in Europe. The charger produced by Epyon charges electric 9-person taxi-vans in 30 minutes. In 2016 Essent opened 5 bio-gas CNG stations being the first Dutch utility company to sell CNG fuel to the transport market.
