= Lectron (EVSE manufacturer) =

American electric vehicle infrastructure company

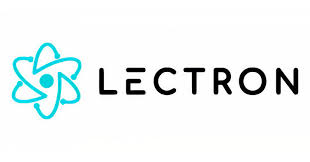
- Type: Private
- Industry: Electric vehicle infrastructure
- Founded: 2017; 9 years ago
- Founder: Christopher Maiwald
- Headquarters: Minnesota, United States
- Area served: Worldwide
- Key people: Christopher Maiwald (CEO); Hok Man Chan (COO); Jay Goldman (CRO)
- Products: Electric vehicle chargers and accessories
- Website: ev-lectron.com

Lectron is a multinational electric vehicle infrastructure company founded in 2017 and headquartered in the United States and Hong Kong, with operations in China and Vietnam. The company manufactures EV chargers, including home charging stations and portable chargers, as well as electric vehicle accessories such as adapters.

Lectron is a manufacturer of electric vehicle supply equipment (EVSE) and accessories. Its product lineup includes dedicated home/residential and portable Level 1 and Level 2 electric vehicle charging stations, EV accessories, portable chargers, and NACS to CCS adapters.

== History ==
Lectron was founded in 2017 by Christopher Maiwald, with an initial investment of $15,000. The company lists its primary corporate headquarters in Minnesota, with operational offices in Los Angeles, California and Kowloon, Hong Kong, and manufacturing operations in China and Vietnam.

In 2023, Lectron introduced its first Level 1 and Level 2 EV chargers featuring Wi-Fi connectivity and app control for SAE J1772 and SAE J3400 (North American Charging Standard) charging standards. Lectron's SAE J3400 chargers use a native NACS connector, allowing compatible Tesla vehicles to charge without an adapter.

Following the standardization of SAE J3400 in 2024, Lectron expanded its range of EV charging adapters, including the Vortex Plug and Vortex Plus NACS to CCS adapter. The company has subsequently supplied or co-developed EV adapters for several automakers, including Ford Motor Company, General Motors, Rolls-Royce Motor Cars, Mercedes-Benz, Rivian, Lucid Motors, Honda and Toyota. In 2026, BMW and Mini selected the Vortex Plus adapter as an approved recommended product for its customers accessing the Tesla Supercharger network and launched a co-branded product page on Lectron's website.

In 2026, Lectron announced UL 2252 certification for four types of EV charging adapters: NACS to CCS, CCS to NACS, NACS to J1772, and J1772 to NACS. In 2026, Lectron launched the Nexus Level 2 Charging Station for residential use.

== Products ==
Lectron manufactures a range of electric vehicle charging equipment and accessories. Its product range includes residential and portable EV chargers, charging cables, and adapters for different charging standards and connector types.

Its charging products include Level 1 and Level 2 portable chargers and wall-mounted charging stations. The company also manufactures adapters for connecting vehicles and charging equipment using different standards, including J1772, NACS, and CCS. Notable products include the Nexus Level 2 Wall Box Charger and the Vortex Plus NACS to CCS DC charging adapter. Lectron NACS to CCS adapter is designed for safe, high-voltage charging in compliance with the J3400 standard, and is rated for 1,000 volts and 500 amps, allowing users to add up to 150 miles of range in just 15 minutes, depending on the vehicle and the version of the Supercharger; It is known for built-in temperature controls in ensuring safe charging, making it compatible with all EVs in the North American Charging Standard.

Lectron is considered as one of the largest manufacturers of EV charging adapters, with a production capacity of at least 12,000 units per week. The company's manufacturing hub located in Shenzhen, China, which is known for producing roughly 500,000 charging units annually and is currently operating at 85% capacity utilization.

== Awards and recognition ==
In September 2024, Car and Driver named Lectron's Vortex adapter as one of the best NACS-to-CCS adapters, citing "the Lectron Vortex Plug is our preferred third-party NACS-to-CCS adapter for DC fast-charging. We preferred its latching system over the A2Z EV."

In April 2026, The Wirecutter named Lectron's portable Level 1 & 2 EV charger "the best J1772 charger to carry with you." In June 2026, The National Law Review named Lectron one of the best EV charger brands in the United States, citing "Among the leading contenders, Lectron has emerged as a primary choice for drivers seeking a balance of universal compatibility and verified safety, particularly through its commitment to UL 2594 and Energy Star certifications."

== See also ==
- List of companies of the United States by state
- List of Minnesota companies
- Electric vehicle charging infrastructure
- Plug-in electric vehicles in the United States and Canada by charging connector
