= SemaConnect =

U.S. EV charging company, acquired by Blink in 2022

- Company type: Public
- Industry: Electric vehicle infrastructure
- Founded: 2008; 17 years ago
- Founder: Mahi Reddy
- Defunct: June 23, 2023
- Fate: Acquired by Blink Charging
- Headquarters: Bowie, Maryland, United States
- Area served: North America
- Products: ChargePro™, Series 4 EV Charging Station, Series 5 EV Charging Station, Series 6 EV Charging station, Series 7/7 Plus EV Charging Station, Series 8 EV Charging Station
- Website: SemaConnect

SemaConnect was an electric vehicle infrastructure company located in Bowie, Maryland, founded in 2008 by entrepreneur, Mahi Reddy. The company and its assets were acquired by Blink Charging in June 2022. In late 2023, Blink Charging officially migrated SemaConnect infrastructure onto the Blink Network, therefore phasing out the use of the SemaConnect brand entirely.

== Company ==
SemaConnect is a developer and producer of smart networked Electric Vehicle charging stations and electric vehicle software for station owners and EV drivers. The company launched in 2008 with the first ChargePro 620 edition and EV software called SemaCharge.

SemaConnect has 150 ChargePro charging stations in Maryland, Virginia and Washington, D.C. In 2011, SemaConnect partnered with 350Green for the launch of 1,500 charging stations across the U.S. at retailers including Walgreens and Simon Properties. In July 2015, SemaConnect raised $15 million to expand their electric car network and customer support services.

== ChargePro ==
The ChargePro charging station uses the North American standard SAEJ1772 connector for Level 2 charging. The ChargePro charging station is designed for installation in commercial properties including municipal, parking, multifamily, hotel, office and retail locations. The ChargePro can have a single or double head unit, and can come with or without a cable management system.

== Partnerships ==
1. SemaConnect uses MobileNOW to permit EV Charging payment by cell phone with the Charge Pro.
2. SemaConnect uses PlugShare (under company Recargo) technology to offer public charger payment options.

== Acquisition by Blink Charging ==
In June 2022 it was announced that Miami, Florida–based EV charging network Blink Charging would be acquiring SemaConnect in a $200 million stock and cash deal. SemaConnect's founder and CEO, Mahi Reddy, is to join Blink's board of directors.

On June 23, 2023, Blink Charging started migrating all existing SemaConnect customers and their infrastructure onto their own network as part of their upcoming maintenance. This resulted the SemaConnect app and its website to permanently shut down as part of the migration. On June 25, 2023, Blink Charging announced that they have finalized the migration, welcoming existing SemaConnect customers onto their own network.

== See also ==
- Plug-in vehicle
- Plug-in hybrid vehicle
- Electric vehicle
- Electric vehicle infrastructure
- Charging station
