= Zero Carbon World =

English charity organization

- Legal status: Charity
- Headquarters: Grimsby, United Kingdom
- Region served: United Kingdom
- Official language: English
- Website: www.zerocarbonworld.org

Zero Carbon World is a British charity that promotes a net-zero emissions objective by supporting carbon reduction projects. It is a registered in England and Wales and also registered as a Limited liability company.

== Objectives ==
The objectives of the charity are:

1. To implement carbon reduction projects
2. To challenge the misconceptions surrounding carbon reduction amongst individuals and organizations
3. To encourage greater adoption of sustainable solutions

== Electric vehicle chargers ==
One way that Zero Carbon World aims to meet its objectives is the donation of Electric Vehicle Charging stations to various organisations around the UK. Sites that install donated chargers get added to the charity's ZeroNet EV charger map.

== Sponsorship ==
Zero Carbon World were one of the Sponsors of the 2012 Bath Film Festival which included a showing of Revenge of the Electric Car.
