= Francis Energy =

Electric vehicle charging station operator in the United States

Francis Energy, LLC
- Industry: Electric vehicle charging network
- Founded: 2015; 11 years ago in Tulsa, Oklahoma
- Founder: David Jankowsky

Francis Energy is an electric vehicle DC fast charging station network in the United States, with 154 charging stations in the United States as of November 2023, with plans to develop charging stations in 30 states. The company was founded in 2015 in Tulsa, Oklahoma by David Jankowsky, taking the name of Francis Oil and Gas (now Kaiser-Francis Oil), an oil and gas exploration company founded by Jankowsky's great-grandfather.

The company initially developed a charging network of stations in Oklahoma, and was subsequently awarded contracts to construct stations in other states with funding from state settlements of lawsuits stemming from the Volkswagen emissions scandal, including Alabama and New Mexico. In 2023, Francis Energy was awarded additional contracts to construct EV charging stations using federal funding from the Infrastructure Investment and Jobs Act in Colorado, Kentucky, Ohio, and Pennsylvania.
