= Elektromotive =

British company, acquired by Chargemaster in 2017

- Founded: 2003; 23 years ago in Brighton
- Founders: Calvey Taylor-Haw; Greg Simmons; Mike Earle
- Defunct: 2017
- Fate: Acquired by Chargemaster
- Headquarters: Sussex University Sussex Innovation Centre, United Kingdom
- Brands: Elektrobay
- Subsidiaries: Charge Your Car

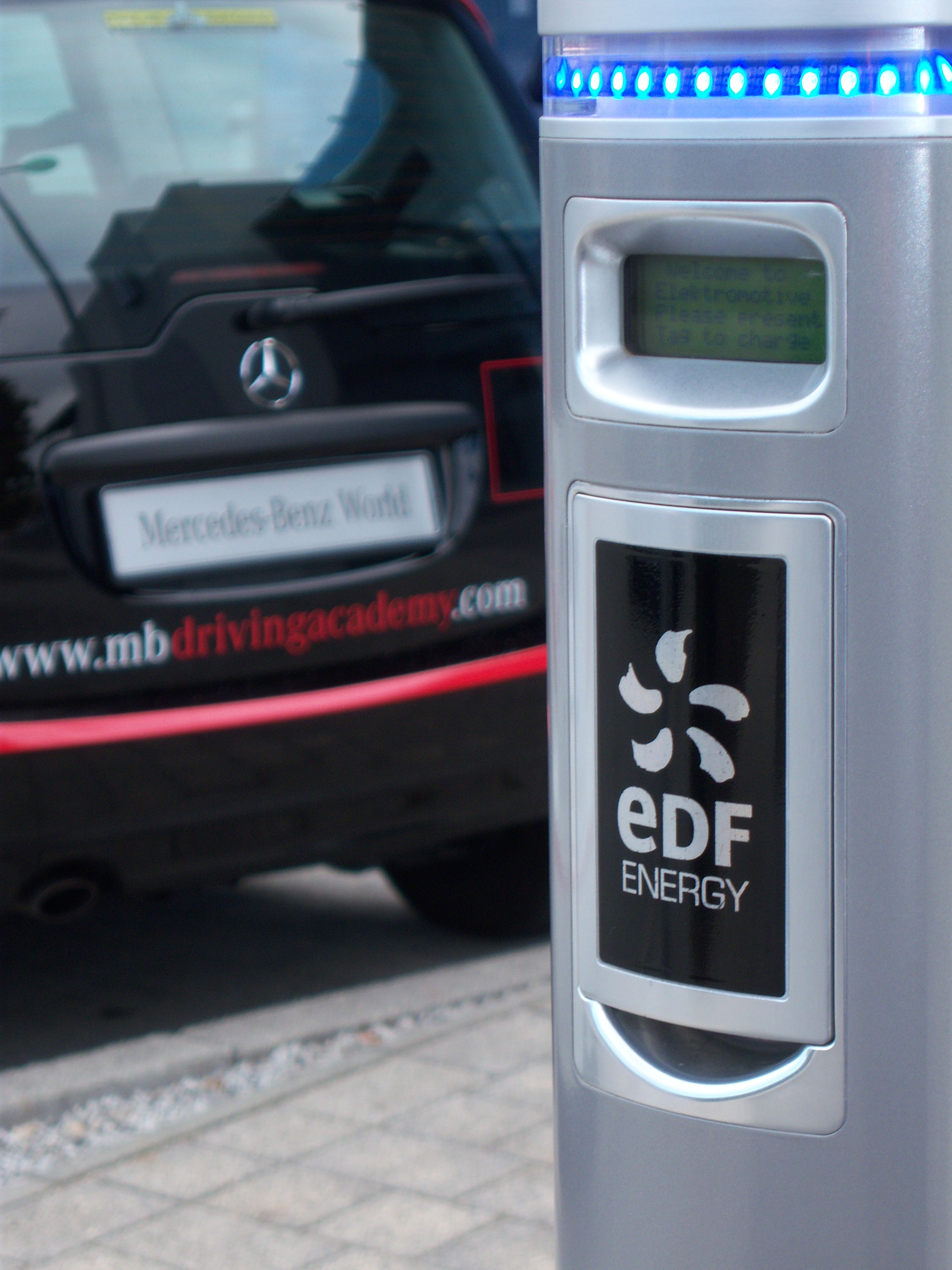
An Elektrobay charging station

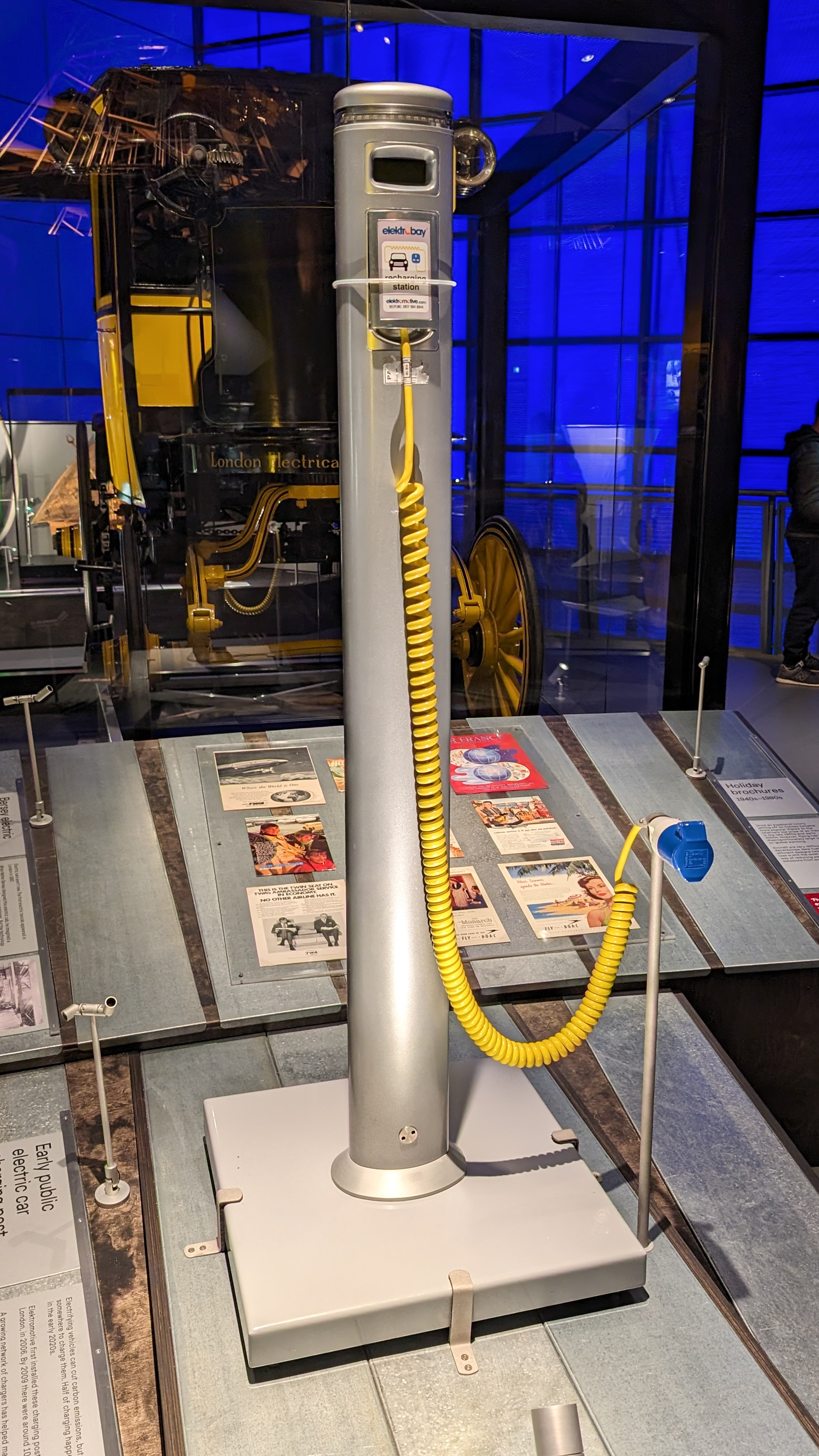
An Elektromotive charging post from around 2009, displayed in the Science Museum, London

Elektromotive was a British company, acquired by Chargemaster in 2017, specialising in the manufacture and installation of charging infrastructure for electric cars and other electric vehicles, using their trade name of Elektrobay. The company had partnerships with corporations including EDF Energy and Mercedes-Benz to supply charging posts and data services.

== History ==
Elektromotive was founded in Brighton in 2003 by former photographer Calvey Taylor-Haw, mechanical engineer Greg Simmons and motorsport entrepreneur Mike Earle. The company was based at Sussex University at the Sussex Innovation Centre, which acts as a business incubator for startup companies.

The first Elektrobays were installed by Westminster City Council in 2006 (branded as 'Juice Point'), and there were later over 100 units in London.

Elektromotive had a 2009 deal with electricity supplier EDF Energy to part-fund the installation of some Elektrobays in public places. In February 2009, Westminster City Council was accused by energy supplier Npower of infringing its trademark by calling their Elektrobays 'Juice Points'.

The first on-street stations outside London were commissioned in Brighton and Hove in September 2009, although over 90 stations were already operational on private sites outside London.

=== Charge Your Car ===
Elektromotive's Charge Your Car subsidiary provided "back office" services to charge point owners, in many cases local authorities. CYC handled user registration and billing, and provided a map of charge points, but did not own or maintain any points.

== Acquisition ==
In January 2017, the Competition and Markets Authority gave Chargemaster permission to acquire Elektromotive and Charge Your Car, which was completed in the same month. At that time the company had around 190 staff. Charge Your Car continued for a time as a subsidiary of BP Chargemaster.

== Products ==
The company's main product was a range of Elektrobay units for charging vehicles that supply 13 A at 230 V, as well as a 32 A version (single or three phase) for faster charging of vehicles. These are available as free-standing posts or wall mounted, and with a range of connectors. They also offer intelligent systems to communicate with the vehicle while charging.

== Partnerships ==
Elektrobay recharging units were installed at Mercedes-Benz dealerships from 2010.
