= Smålandsstenar =

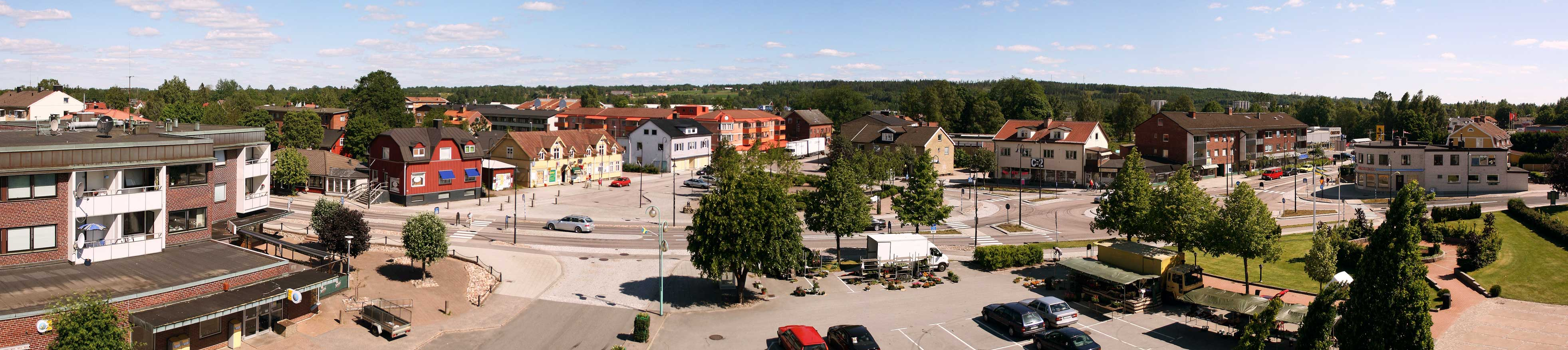
- Central Smålandsstenar

- Location within Jönköping Location within Sweden
- Coordinates: 57°10′N 13°24′E
- Country: Sweden
- Province: Småland
- County: Jönköping County
- Municipality: Gislaved Municipality

Area
  - Total: 4.65 km^{2} (1.80 sq mi)

Population (31 December 2010)
  - Total: 4,530
  - Density: 974/km^{2} (2,520/sq mi)
- Time zone: UTC+1 (CET)
  - Summer (DST): UTC+2 (CEST)
- Climate: Cfb

Smålandsstenar (Swedish pronunciation: [smoːlandˈstêːnar]) is a locality situated in Gislaved Municipality, Jönköping County, Sweden with 4,530 inhabitants in 2010.

In sports Smålandsstenar Tennisclub have a central position as the most successful athletic-club developing tennis players such as ATP-ranked; Hans Simonsson, Stefan Simonsson, Håkan Johansson, Peter Svensson, Claes Persson and WTA-ranked Linda Åqvist.

== Gallery ==
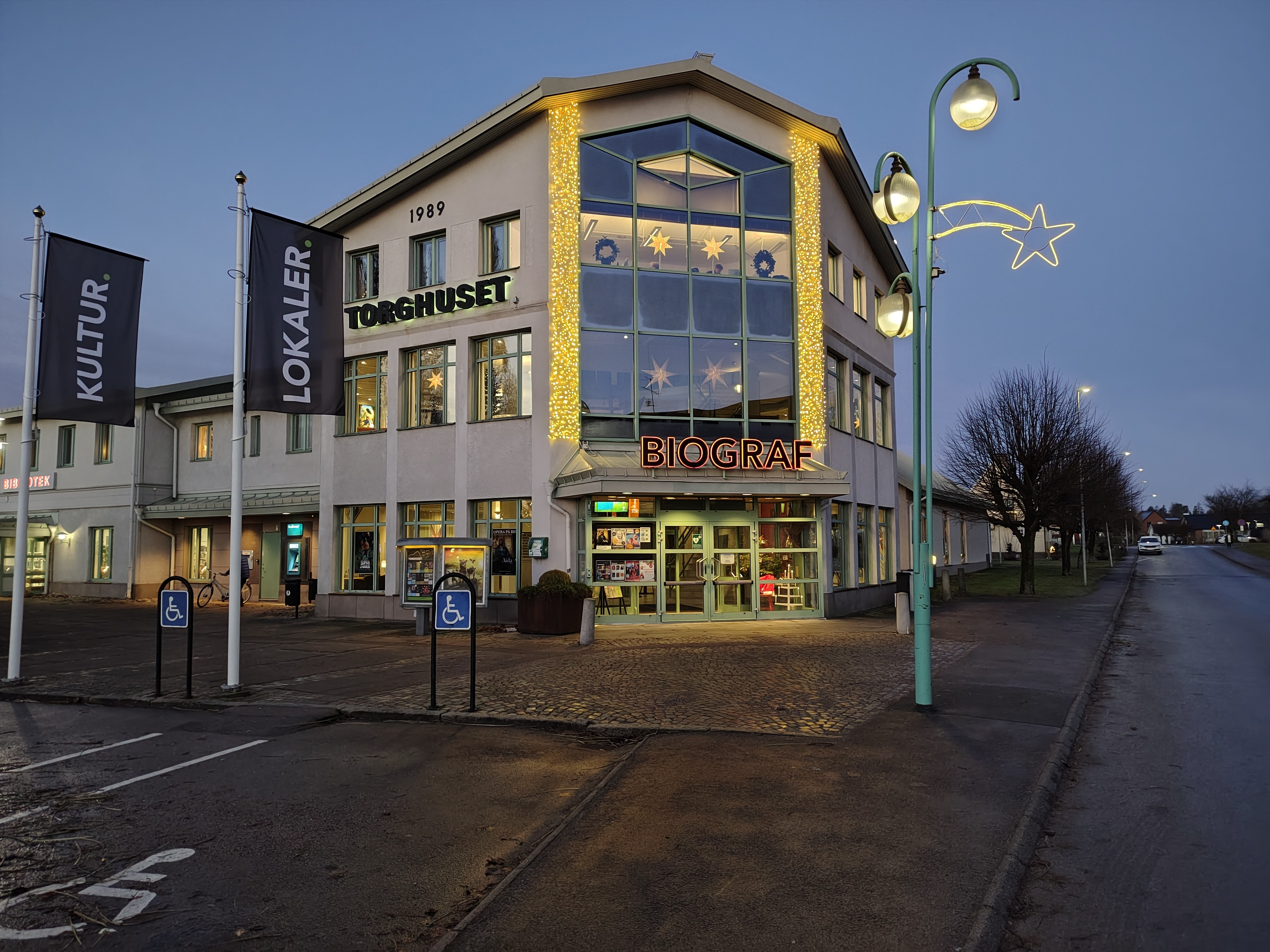
Cinema in Smålandsstenar

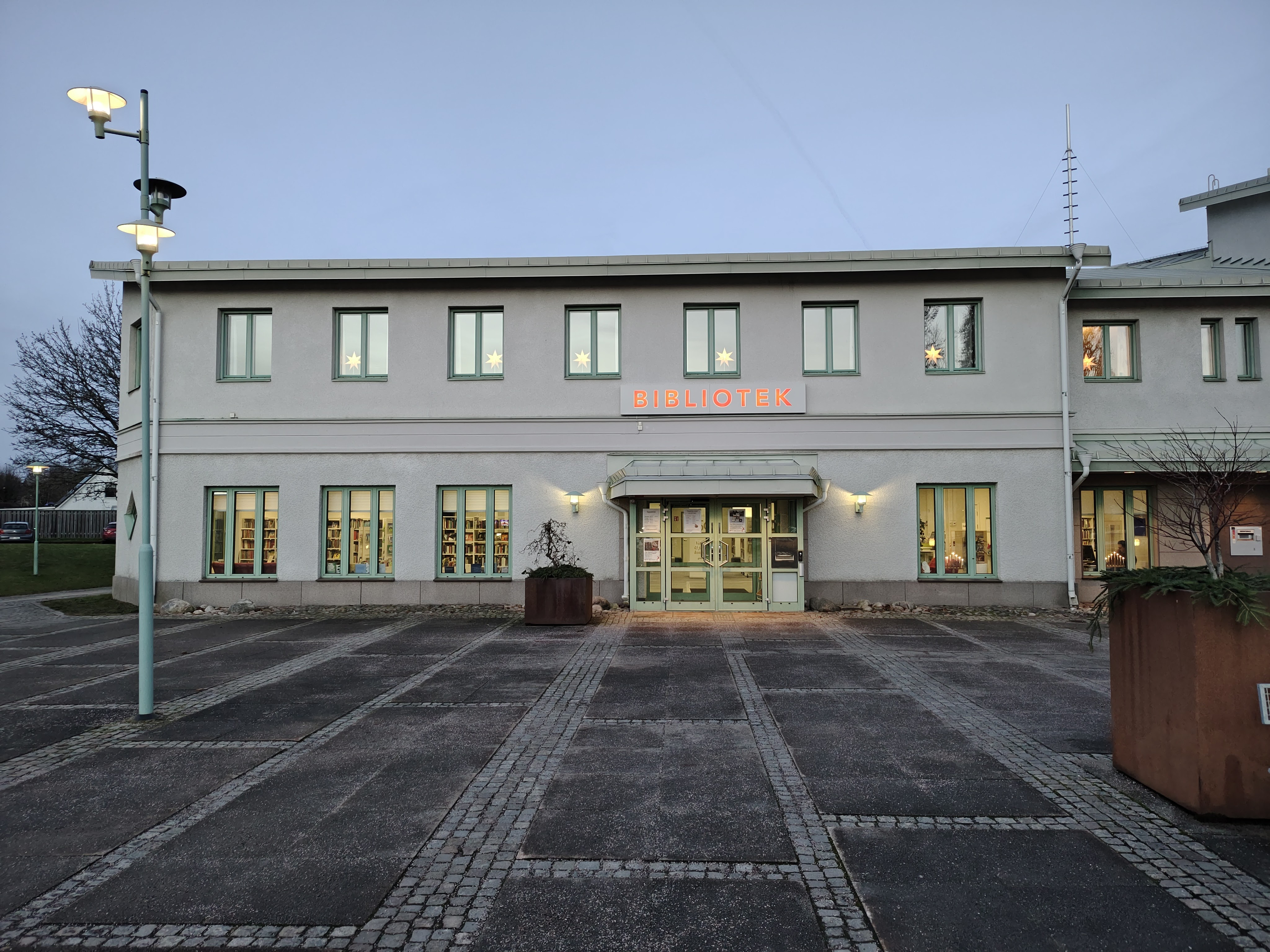
Smålandsstenar Public Library
