= Epyon =

Dutch electronics company

Epyon B.V.
- Type: Besloten vennootschap
- Industry: Electronics
- Founded: 2006, Delft
- Headquarters: Rijswijk, the Netherlands
- Area served: Europe
- Key people: Hans Streng (CEO), Crijn Bouman, Wouter Robers, Wouter Smit (founders)
- Products: Fast Chargers for electric vehicles
- Number of employees: 50 (FTE, 2010)
- Website: www.epyonpower.com

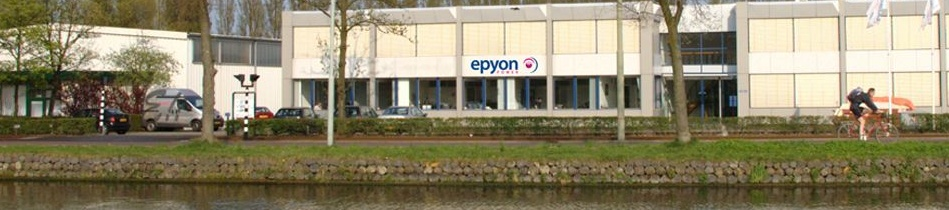
Epyon headquarters in Rijswijk

Epyon is a Dutch company that produces fast-chargers for electric vehicles.

Epyon opened Europe's first commercial fast-charging station in May 2010 in the Netherlands. The system can deliver 50 kilowatts of power to charge a nine-person taxi van in 30 minutes. Epyon's system offers the ability to charge multiple vehicles at the same time, remote configuration, and an Internet-based system that lets Dutch utility Essent bill customers for use. The Netherlands-based station will be used to charge two nine-person taxi van EVs from local taxi company Kijlstra.

Epyon's charge stations are compliant with the CHAdeMO standard, which is used by the Nissan Leaf and the Mitsubishi i MiEV. Epyon's charging station can provide an 80 percent charge for the Leaf's 24-kWh battery pack in about 30 minutes.

Epyon was bought by ABB in 2011.

== History ==
Epyon started in 2006 based on advances of nanotechnology in batteries. The first product of Epyon was a 1-minute telephone charger called the FlashPack. The FlashPack had an internal battery or super capacitor that could be charged in under a minute. Epyon abandoned the telephone market to serve the electric vehicle market before the FlashPack reached the stores.

Epyon's chargers are remotely managed by its power routing network, which computes the local power grid, billing, and battery life management.

In October 2010, Epyon showed an AC/DC combined charging post together with Nissan at the Paris Motor Show.

In November 2010 Lite-On announced it invested into Epyon. Epyon raised 7 Million Euros in this investment round.

On June 30, 2011, ABB acquired Epyon.

On May 20, 2014, Epyon technology was recognized as the Cleantech Startup of the Decade, with the award going to buyer ABB.

== Products ==
Epyon builds CHAdeMO certified chargers:

- Terra 51: a 50 kW fast charger
- Terra Charge Post: A small envelope fast-charge post for use with their Base station.
- Terra Base station: A cabinet with the power electronics that can connect up to 4 charge posts.
- Luna: A retrofit box to convert an electric car to CHAdeMO.
