= German Solar Mobility Association =

Bundesverband Solare Mobilität
- Founded: 2. December 1989
- Location(s): Münster Berlin (since 2010)
- Key people: Thomic Rushmeyer, Andreas Manthey (chairmen)
- Website: www.bsm-ev.de

The German Solar Mobility Association / German Bundesverband Solare Mobilität (Federal Association Solar Mobility) is an interest group in Germany to further electric mobility in combination of regenerative resources for the required electricity. The BSM is the provider of the Park & Charge network in Germany. The BSM is member of a number of committees of the German government including the National Electric Mobility Platform.

== History ==
The association was founded on 2. December 1989 by Roland Reichel and Thomic Ruschmeyer to assemble a number of makers and drivers of solar cars that had been mostly electric quadricycles at the time (often summarized in English in the Neighborhood Electric Vehicle class). Its original name Fahrer- und Konstrukteurverband Solarmobil points to the original research interest in solar vehicles around that time (the Tour de Sol races began in 1985).

In that the association has a similar root as the Swiss Elektromobil Club der Schweiz (founded in 1993) and the German association took on a new name as Bundesverband Solarmobil (Federal Association Solar Mobiles) in 1992. Both organizations have since cooperated and in 1997 the BSM took over the responsibility for the parts of the Park & Charge network in Germany (originally conceived from a pilot project in Switzerland to allow drivers of solar vehicles to plug into the public electricity grid to enlarge their operating range).

In the mid of 2004 the association was renamed to Federal Association Solar Mobility to emphasize its interest beyond construction of vehicles.

The periodical of the association is the quarterly "Solarmobil" journal that had been originally created by the Solar Mobile Association Erlangen (Solarmobil Verein Erlangen) in 1987. The journal serves as the joint organ of the regional solar mobile clubs and the federal association since 1991. The journal has a total circulation of 2000 copies (12–2008).

== See also ==
- Electric vehicle network
- de:Bundesverband Windenergie
