= Park & Charge =

European infrastructure for charging electric vehicles

Park & Charge is a European infrastructure for charging electric vehicles. Park & Charge has operated the open database LEMnet since 1998, which lists its own charging stations as well as that of other infrastructure providers in Europe.

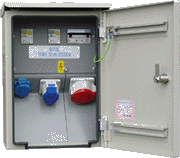
Traditional charging station of the existing Park&Charge charge station system (left to right): small Domestic socket-outlet (10–16 A, 250 V); CEE 16 A, 250 V; CEE 16 A,400 V

== History ==
In 1992, the first four locations of Park & Charge were established under the "pilot and demonstration project P & D" of the Federal Office of Energy in Bern. After a three-year experimental phase, the project went into regular operation. The Electromobile Club of Switzerland (ECS), which has accompanied the project, took over the financial and legal responsibility for Park & Charge. At the end of 1997 Park & Charge was founded as an independent association (President: Wilfried Blum, Managing Director: Eduard Stolz).

Park & Charge stations became available beyond the borders as well. The German Solar Mobility Association founded an organization for the operation in Germany in 1997. Since 1999 there are Park & Charge stations in Italy and Austria. As for Austria VLOTTE has taken over the operations since 2010 which is a project by the "Vorarlberger Elektroautomobil Planungs- und Beratungs GmbH" in cooperation with the VKW Utility Company Vorarlberg (Vorarlberger Kraftwerke AG). More charging points became available in Liechtenstein, France and the Netherlands.

In the Canton Ticino the federal "P & D" project was continued with studies for „Veicoli Elettrici Leggeri“ (light electric vehicles) running from 1995 to 2001 (VEL1) and from 2001 to 2005 (VEL2). With the help of those projects an electric vehicle network of charging stations was deployed which is operated by RiParTI (Ricariche e Parcheggi in Ticino – Charging and Parking in Ticino).

== Function ==
Park & Charge Key

The yearly subscription entitles the user use of all the Park & Charge Charging points in Europe at a (flat rate). The prices of the subscription is set by the respective national organizations.

== Charging Stations ==
Today allows Park & Charge is at nearly 500 locations in Switzerland, Germany, Austria, the Netherlands and Italy. The service provides users with convenient options to charge their vehicles at various public and private locations, such as shopping centers, hotels, and parking garages. This network is part of Park & Charge’s broader effort to support the widespread adoption of electric mobility by ensuring that EV drivers have easy access to charging infrastructure throughout Europe.

== LEMnet ==
The locations of the charging stations of Park & Charge are assembled in a list for its members. After the reorganization the new association created an internet database in 1998 to publish the list of available charging stations. The name LEMnet is derived from the main vehicle type of Park & Charge members at the time being light electric vehicles (LEV – in German Leichtelektromobile LEM) being electric quadricycles that are often summarized in English in the Neighborhood Electric Vehicle class. Those only need an electrical outlet to be charged overnight so that LEMnet also listed inns that cooperate with electric vehicle owners.

With the revival and mass production of electric vehicles the LEMnet database served as a central overview mapping the available charging stations across Europe. The providers of commercial charging station networks began to provide their data to LEMnet - in 2012 more than 30 providers cooperated with LEMnet. On 26 March 2012 it was decided form a new association to run the LEMnet database – the LEMnet Europe e.V.' is supported by Park & Charge and the E-Mobility Cluster, Mitteldeutschland.

LEMnet statistics
time range	number of entries
until 2007	600
until 2010	2800
March 2012	3600
October 2014	7200

== See also ==
- Electric vehicle network
- German Solar Mobility Association
- Twike Club members were among the first users.
