= UGE International =

Solar energy company

Coordinates: 40°45′18.9″N 73°59′35.9″W

- Industry: Renewable energy solutions
- Founded: 2008
- Headquarters: New York, NY, New York, United States
- Number of locations: Toronto, Cebu
- Area served: Worldwide
- Key people: Nick Blitterswyk, CEO
- Products: Solar panels, energy storage, power management systems, remote monitoring systems
- Services: Commercial solar energy projects
- Number of employees: 100–150
- Website: www.ugei.com

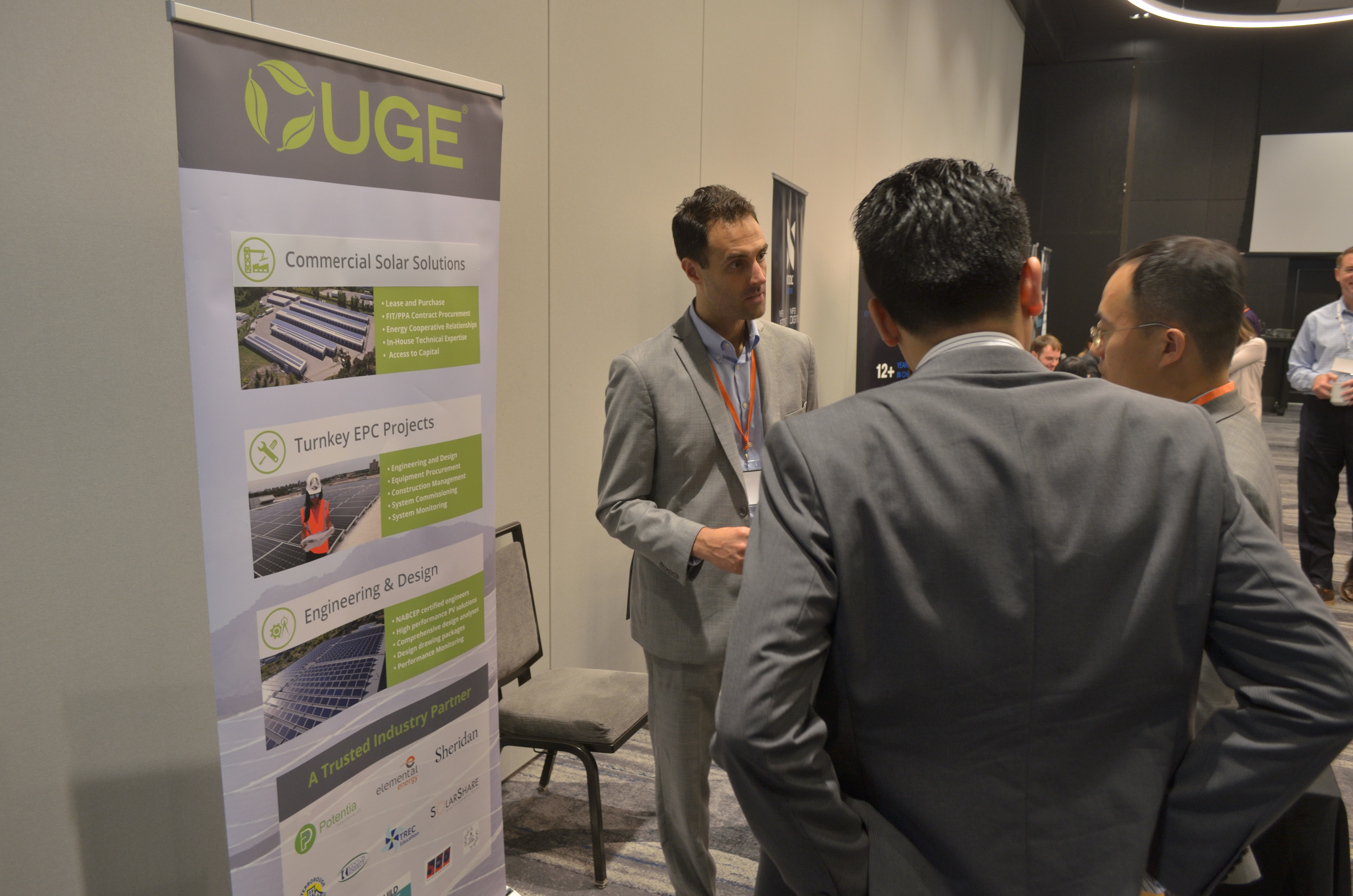
UGE International CEO and founder at a conference

UGE International is a worldwide distributed solar energy company, founded in 2008, with headquarters in New York City and Toronto, and a local office in the Philippines. As of 2021, the company has installed 500MW of solar energy worldwide and completed more than 700 projects. In 2024, UGE was acquired by investment firm NOVA Infrastructure.

== Services ==
The company develops, owns, and operates community and commercial solar & energy storage projects. Building owners, landowners, and institutional and commercial entities serve as site hosts for the solar projects. Residential and commercial off-takers subscribe to receive electricity from the solar projects. UGEngineering, a subsidiary of UGE International, provides engineering consulting services to clients in the United States and abroad.

== History ==
In August 2013, the company raised $20m fund from Tamra-Tacoma Capital Partners (now Energent L.P.) to provide financing for uge's fast-growing telecoms segment and secured $5M investment from Energine in April 2014.

In 2014 the company was publicly listed on the TSX Venture Exchange (TSX:UGE.V). The Haywood Securities initiated research coverage on the company in November 2017, setting a target share price of $1 and in June 2018, the SeeThru Equity initiated coverage with a price target of C$1.02 / $0.78.

In March 2015, the company closed its non-brokered private placement of units (the "Units") at $1.50 per Unit for aggregate gross proceeds of CAD 1,784,751. The company acquired all of the issued and outstanding equity shares of Endura Energy Project Corp. in February 2016.

In 2017, UGE signed a $15 million contract with Peterborough Utilities that become one of the largest contracts in their history. The company also signed an agreement with a syndicate of underwriters the same year according to which the underwriters agreed to purchase three million units from the company at 60 cents per unit on a bought deal private placement basis for aggregate gross proceeds of $1.8-million.

In 2025, UGE acquired 122 solar projects from OYA Renewables in a bankruptcy auction. The 2.35GW portfolio spans 14 states.
