= Fast charging network =

Public charging stations for EVs

A fast charging network, or more specifically an HPC charging network, is a network of publicly accessible fast charging stations for electric vehicles. A fast charging network is a subtype of an electric vehicle charging network.

== History ==
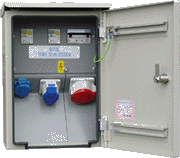
Park-&-Charge switch box with a Red CEE outlet

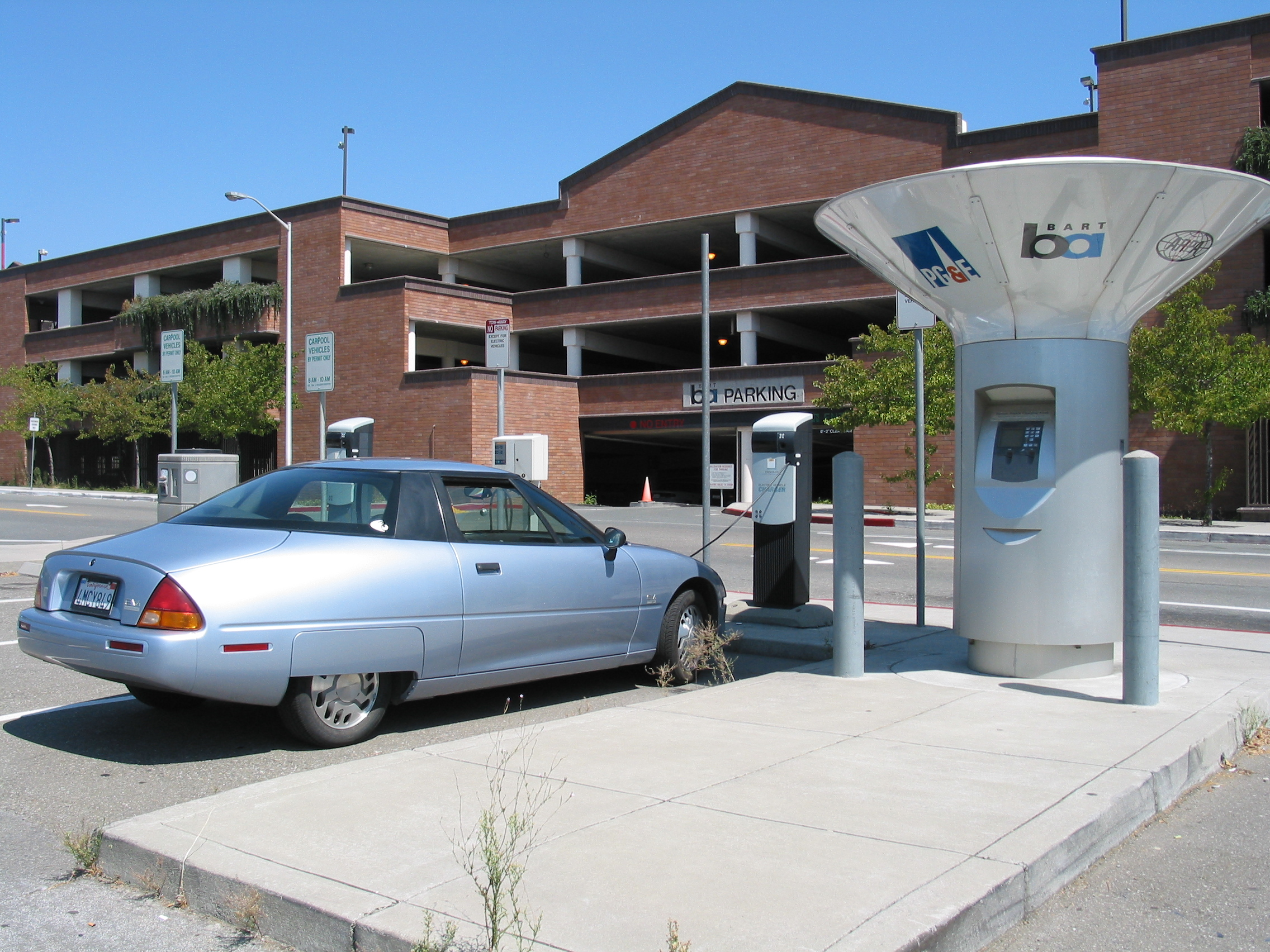
EV1 at a BART station

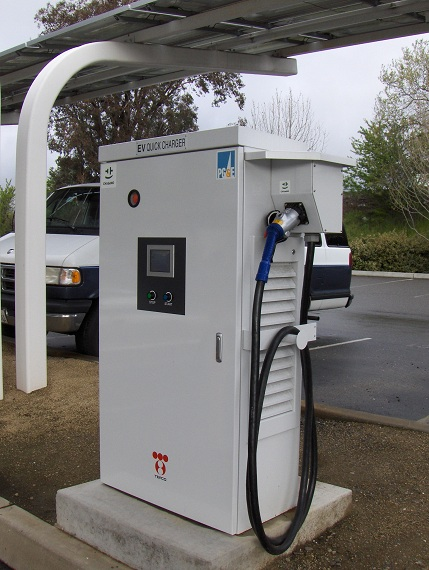
Chademo station in 2011 in California

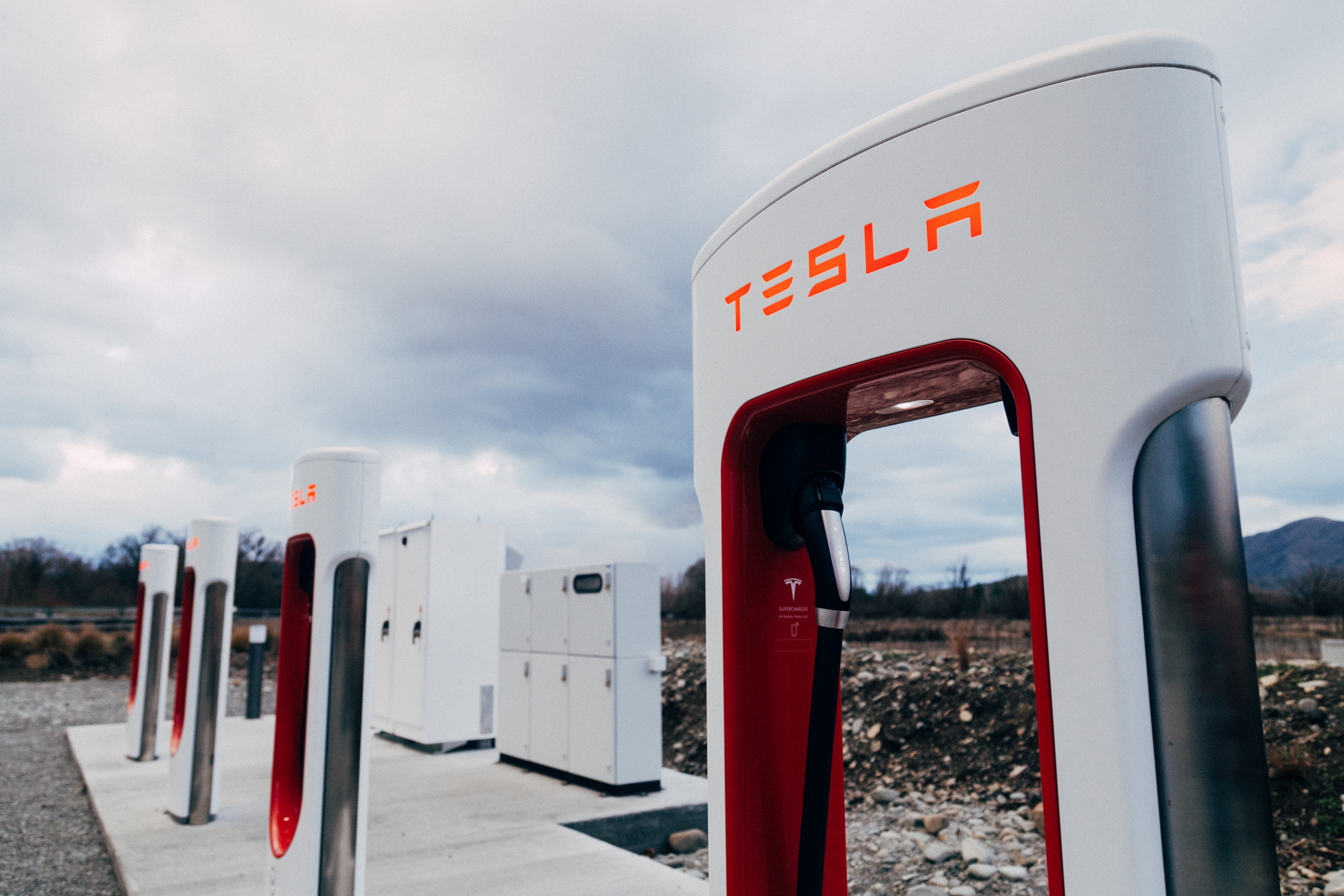
Tesla Supercharger with converter

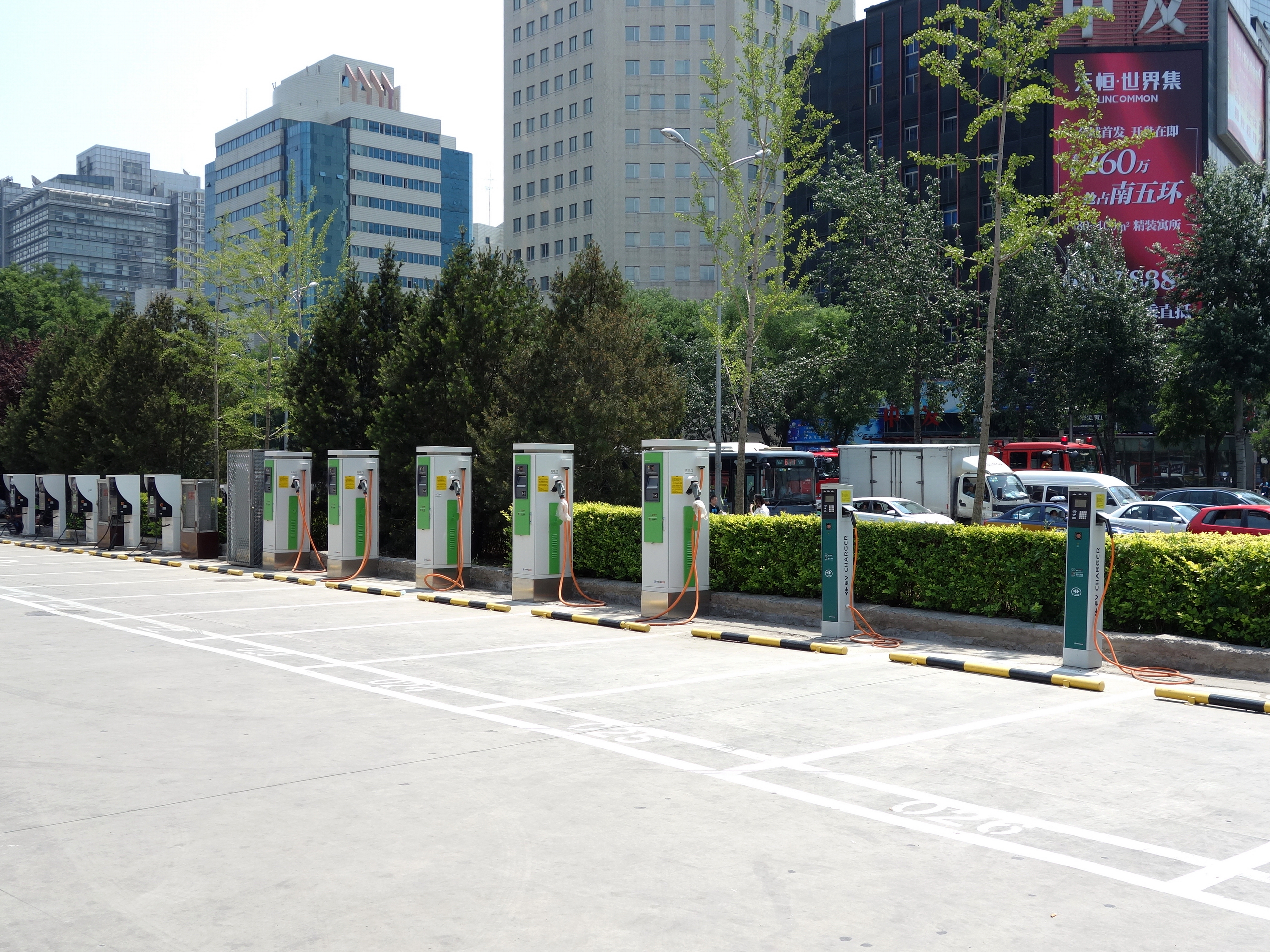
Charging park in Beijing in 2016

Electric vehicles have the advantage that they do not require any special infrastructure for charging when they are launched on the market, but they can rely on the widespread availability for household electricity. For long-distance travel however the charging breaks can get long and may require an overnight stay. The charging points at houses are typically limited to 7 to 16 A at 220-240 volts (1.5 kW to 3.8 kW). The question of whether you will reach your destination or the intermediate point with a full charge of the drive battery has led to range anxiety. In addition to having particularly large batteries - the Tesla Model S from 2012 reached over 600 km - people began to set up fast charging points on long-distance routes. Tesla's Superchargers showed that impressively, although they were not the first fast charging network.

=== Fast charging ===
The pioneers of interrelated public charging points can be found in the Park & Charge sites, where the pilot project dates back to 1992 in Switzerland. The microcars (quadricycles) supported by this did not have large batteries, so that 3-phase power outlets (32 A at 400 volts) shortened the charging stops sufficiently to enable longer day trips. In the form of an association in which private individuals set up a switch box for the use of other members, the charging points spread further in Europe, mostly on private properties. Authorization to use them consisted of having the appropriate key for the switch box, which was handed out by the association.

When the GM EV1 was developed for California in 1996, public charging points were part of the concept. The GM Hughes Electronics Corporation had already proposed an inductive charging connector for public charging points in 1992. However, the separate charger with 6.6 kW only achieved a little more than the on-board charger for household electricity with 1.2 kW. On top of that, the state-installed public charging points were not usually located on along long travel routes, but rather at train stations preferred for commuters.

In 2007, ChargePoint was founded in California, which not only manufactured wall boxes for private households, but also offered to operate them as public charging stations. Additionally they were able to find retailers to provide a place, so that there were charging stations with ChargePoint Home with 16 A and 32 A for 220 V widely available. The later ChargePoint Home Flex even allowed 50 A. Similar to Park & Charge in Europe, these early locations having up to 11 kW played a key role in closing gaps in later fast charging offerings. With the ChargePoint Express, the company also offered its own fast chargers with Chademo plugs starting in June 2015.

In Japan, a pilot project for electric vehicles was started in 2006, with the participation of Nissan, Mitsubishi and today's Subaru, in which faster public charging points were tested. The first public charging point with the resulting TEPCO plug was set up together with the presentation of the Mitsubishi i-MiEV in 2009. In March 2010, the independent CHAdeMO consortium was set up, in which other Japanese vehicle manufacturers participated. The first specification of this time reached a maximum of 125 A with up to 500 V. The typical Chademo charging stations allowing for 50 kW direct current became the basis for the term fast charging.

When the Nissan Leaf came around in 2010, having a range of up to 160 km (100 miles), the concept of an actual fast charging networks was developed. The Chademo locations were found on roads between cities along corridors, and the navigation system showed the next location along with the calculated remaining range. A charging stop at a 50 kW charger took a maximum of 30 minutes to reach 80%. Plans for a long-distance corridor by the California CARB led to the West Coast Electric Highway with fast charging points every 25 to 50 miles from Canada through Oregon and California to Mexico. The first concept specifically names the Nissan Leaf and Mitsubishi iMiEV, which are supported by it. This first fast charging network was completed in 2013.

The first mass-produced Tesla model in 2012 also saw the start of setting up Tesla Supercharger. While the Chademo locations were often individual charging stations that used a 125 or 250 A building connection from the energy supplier, the Superchargers were usually set up as charging parks with six to ten charging stations that were supplied by a separately installed converter station, which often had a connection to the energy supplier's medium-voltage network. This became the defining feature for locations on highways. The first charging stations in these charging parks already reached 90 kW, increased to 120 kW in 2013 and later to 145 kW. Additionally, the Tesla navigation system took over the planning of the necessary charging stops for a planned trip.

In China, the five-year plan 2015-2020 decided to build 800,000 charging points. In the 2021 evaluation (within the list of 1.1 million public chargers), China had installed 470,000 fast chargers in that period (where statistically every charger with more than 22 kW is counted as fast charging in China).

=== Charging cards ===
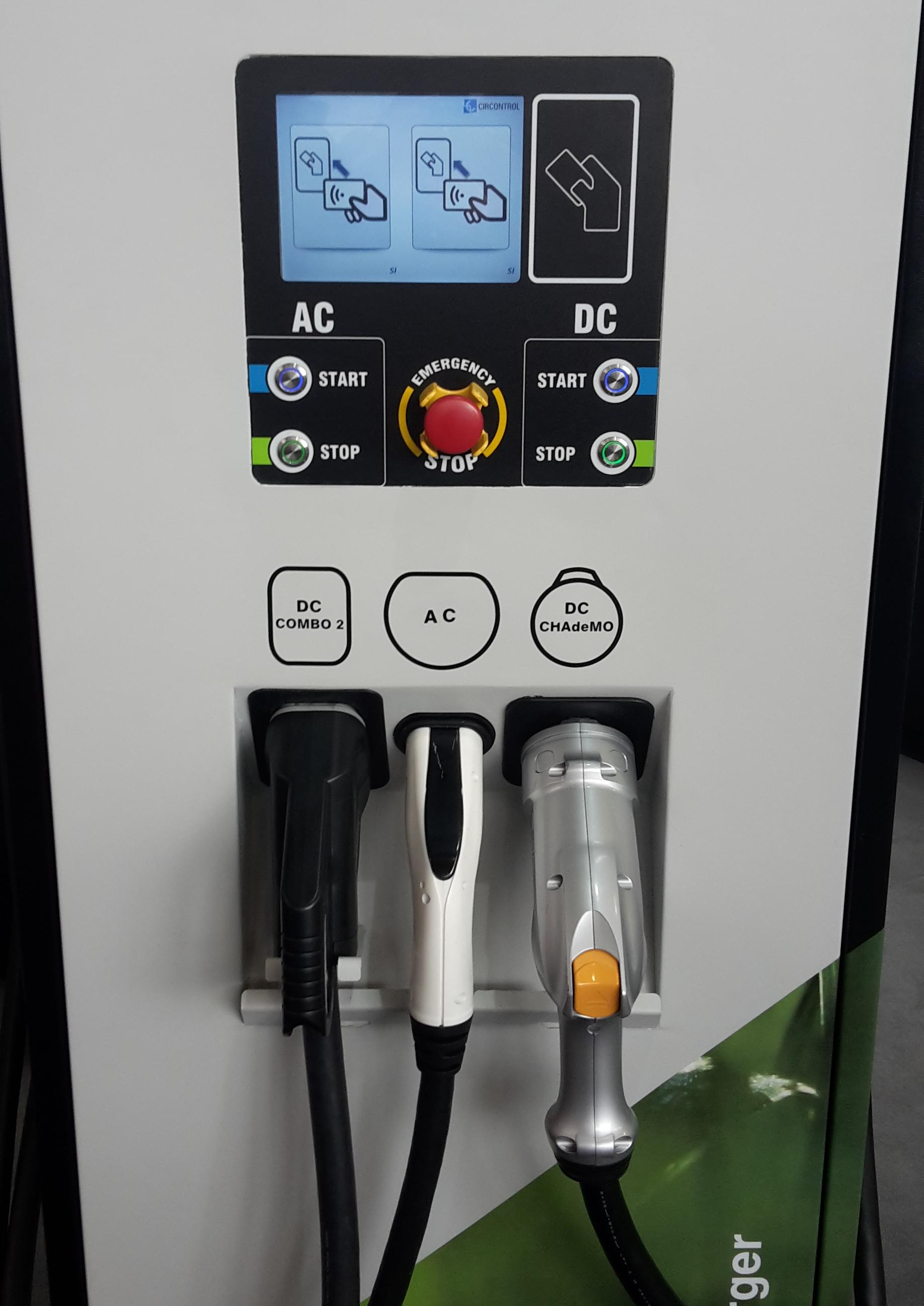
fast charger with multiple cables and card authorization

Initially, the billing of electricity in the early electric vehicle charging networks was made as cheap as possible, as even an additional electricity meter on a house connection drives up the costs that have to be passed on. The first Tesla charging stations were even offered without billing. Since most vehicles could use the full number of amps, the method of metering by the minutes of charging became the widespread basis for billing.

At that time, NFC cards for billing were already known from public transport networks. As charging networks developed further, card readers were integrated into charging stations. The drivers of electric vehicles now had to register with several charging networks if necessary in order to increase the density of charging stations for their travel.

The high investment costs for fast-charging stations led to vehicle manufacturers to bring their own charging stations into a cross-manufacturer network, also enabling access to third-party providers through cooperation with other charging networks, still offering on uniform billing to the customer. With the replacement of vehicle manufacturers building each their own fast charging sites, a distinction was made between the mobility provider (EMSP - E-Mobility Service Provider), which takes care of registration and billing, and the charging station operators (CPO - Charge Point Operator), who keep the charging points operational. The mobility provider commonly creates an app now that displays the charging points that can be offered for a charging process for their own tariff, or showing third-party providers stations marking them having a different tariff. In technical terms, the Open Charge Point Protocol (OCPP) approach to performance billing became widespread.

=== HPC charging network ===
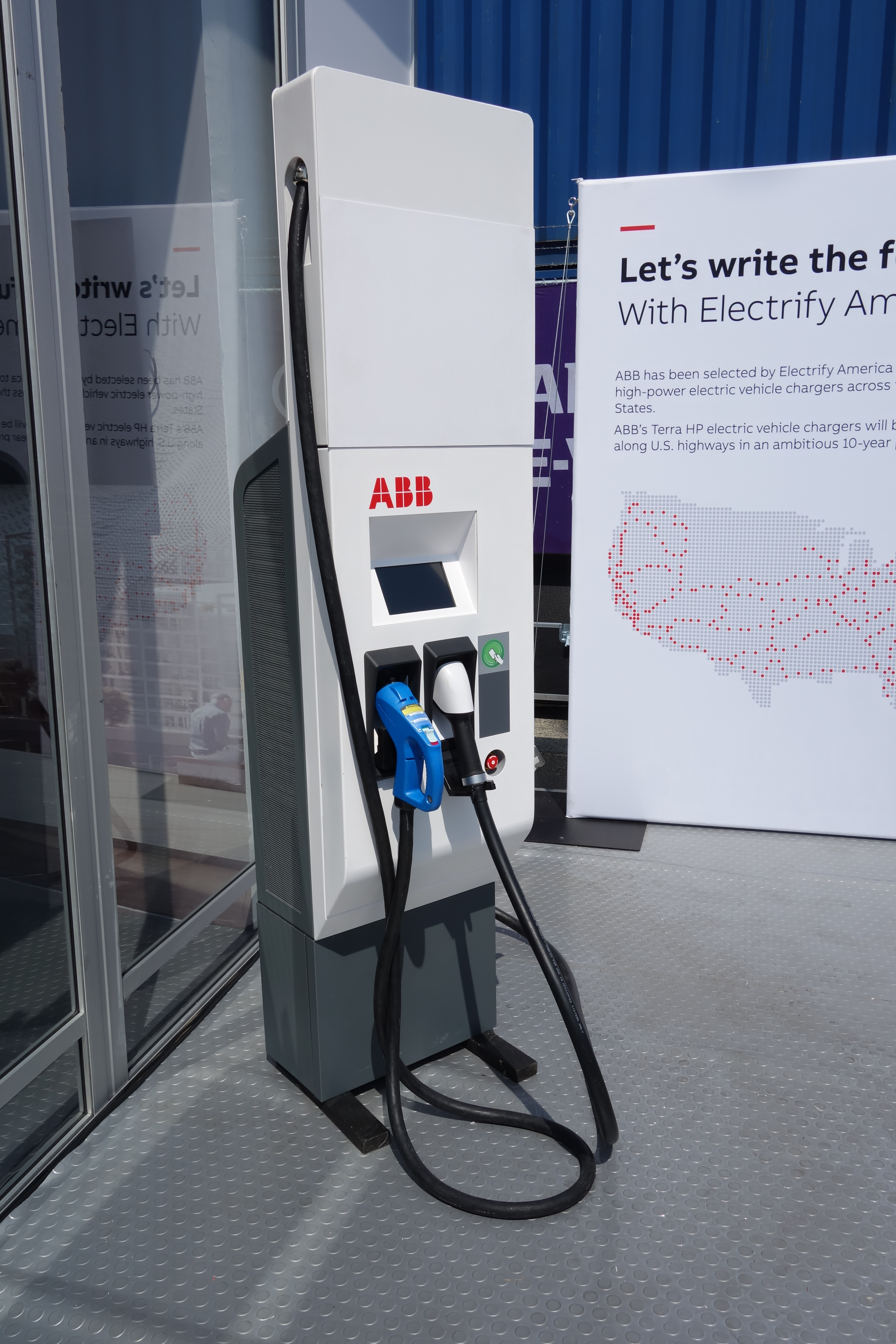
ABB Terra HP in 2018

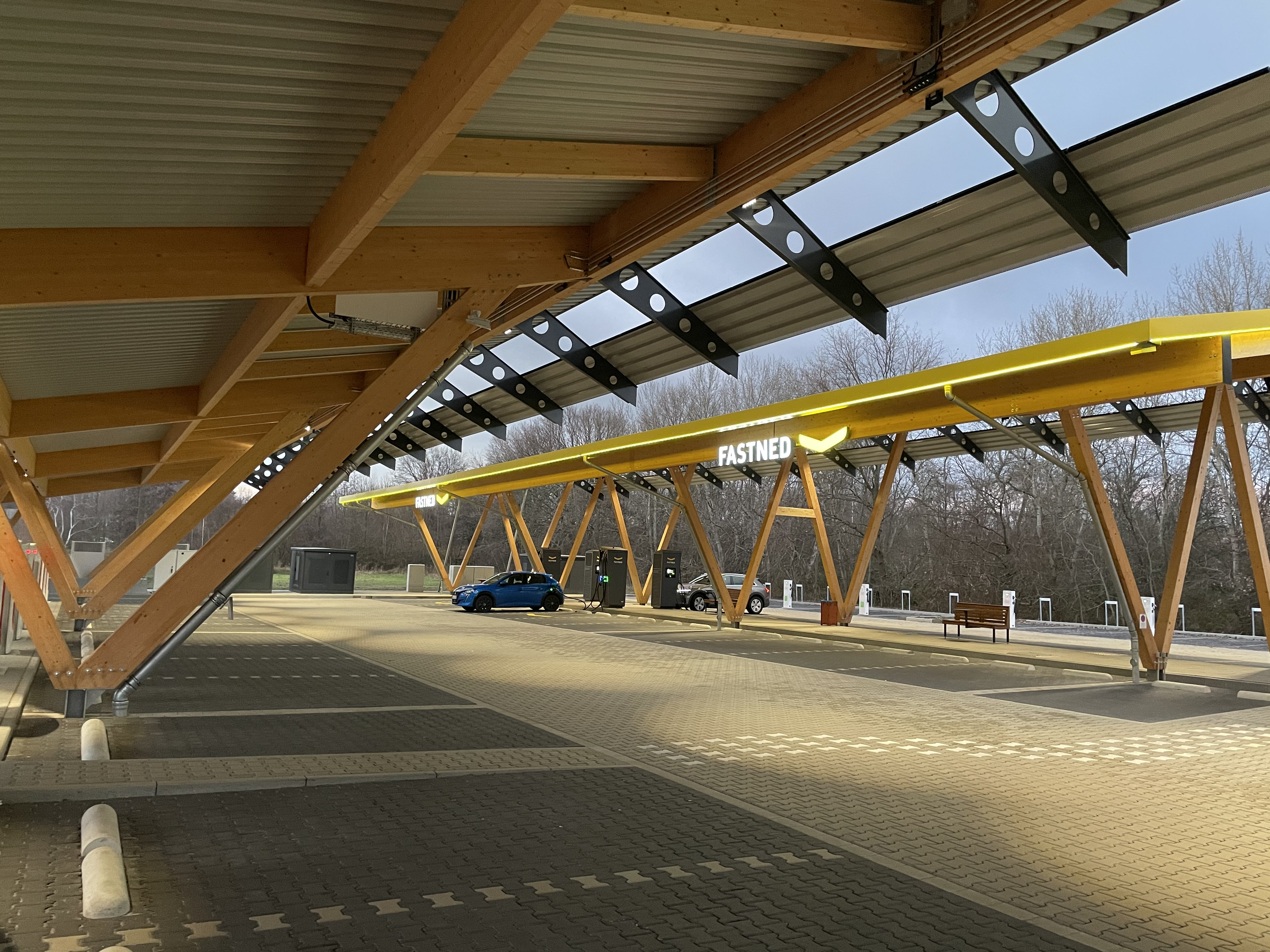
Fastned HPC in Hilden^{video}

The Tesla Superchargers showed that the range of a day's journey is hardly reduced for electric cars. The first stations from Tesla in Europe were placed in the corridor from Amsterdam to Munich in 2013, and drivers started to use it instantly. It was predictable at the time that the batteries in the premium segment would become larger over they years - which did actually happen for Tesla Model S, which had originally 70 kWh in 2012, then 85 kWh in 2014, 90 kWh in 2015, and 100 kWh in 2016.

The possibilities are limited to keeping charging stops short for large batteries as the heating of the cable, plug and battery imposes limits. At the IAA 2015 in September, Porsche showed a demonstrator "Mission E", which had twice the on-board voltage of 800 V and it was able to charge at that doubled level. ABB already had liquid-cooled converters on offer for rail vehicles. In October 2015, ABB showed a demonstrator of a 150 kW charging station, and in November 2015, it joined the CharIN consortium, which had been founded in May to promote the Combined Charging System. CharIN was already aiming for an expansion to 350 kW at the time. Version 1.0 of CCS had been standardized up to 200 kW, but it had not yet been implemented. The use of liquid-cooled cables was technically necessary and that had also been tested by Tesla in 2015.

The "Ultra-E" project was founded to promote the next generation of charging stations. It started in October 2016, funded by the EU, with the intention to build 25 fast-charging stations with CCS plugs and 350 kW at intervals of 150 to 200 km in the corridor from Amsterdam/Belgium via Frankfurt/Stuttgart/Munich to Vienna/Graz until the end of 2019. The accompanying Ultra-E study had proposed to limit charging times to 20 minutes, as this would create a new business model with business travelers. The document also mentions the term High-Power Charging Point (HPC).

The first available fast chargers from ABB met the requirements in October 2017 and allowed up to 375 A with liquid-cooled cables. For the vehicles with 400 V electrical systems available at that time, this led to charging stations with 150 kW. This output became the basis for the term high-power charging HPC (from German Hochleistungsladen). In the following years, the cooling was improved, regularly allowing 500 A. The Tesla V3 Superchargers, which started to use liquid-cooled cables by 2019, did allow up to 250 kW (short-term output of 625 A).

In October 2017 the operator Ionity was founded, with most of the companies that were involved in "Ultra-E", to set up the HPC charging network. Until the end of 2020, 400 fast-charging stations with up to 350 kW were to be set up at intervals of around 120 km. The first charging station was put into operation in April 2018, with Tritium now also mentioned alongside the charging station manufacturers ABB and Porsche. Porsche did also equip all its car dealer amenities with 800 V stations from 2018. The intended vehicle for that, the Porsche Taycan, came onto the market in 2019. Fastned also began setting up HPC charging stations at the same time, the first by ABB in March 2018.

In January 2018, Allego presented the "Mega-E" project, again funded by EU, to build an HPC charging network with 322 locations and 27 EV charging hubs. A total of 1,300 HPC charging points with up to 350 kW were to be built until 2025. From 2021, Allego also began converting the "Fast-E" locations to HPC charging stations. The "Fast-E" project had built 40 fast chargers with 50 kW from 2016, also with EU funding. However, the charging sites had already been prepared for 350 kW. In July 2022, Allego exercised a purchase option on the 100 locations with 770 fast chargers that had already been built.

=== Area coverage ===
TEN corridors

The development along motorways has been ongoing steadily, and by 2020 half of the existing fast charging locations in Germany were equipped with HPC stations. For October 2022, the BDEW (Federal Association of the Energy and Water Industries in Germany) reported that full area coverage along motorways with HPC chargers has been achieved when looking at 50 km grid, and even full area coverage of the 25 km grid was almost achieved. The German federal government had promoted the development from August 2021 with tenders for a Deutschlandnetz. The funding included up to 2 billion Euro expecting 10,000 HPC charging ports, of which 1,8 billion were awarded in 2022.^{(video)} This funding was extended at the end of 2022 adding another 6 billion Euro for the time frame up to 2030 expecting the number of public charging stations to get to 1 million. The infrastructure agency wants to concentrate on fast chargers but no specific goal was defined. This is based on criticism from the industry that points out that delivery times for HPC stations have gone up to about one year.

At the EU level, the AFIR requirements (Alternative Fuels Infrastructure Regulation) set a 60 km grid along the TEN-T core network, which must have at least one HPC charger by 2025 and must have a charging park with HPC chargers by 2030. The AFIR came into force immediately on April 13, 2024. Starting in 2023, the Tesla V4 Superchargers with 350 kW were introduced, which are intended for the Tesla Cybertruck with 800 V electrical system.

The Netherlands were the first to subsidize the charging infrastructure. This had been achieved through agreements with the three local operators, so by April 2023 there were 5201 fast chargers ready in the country. A similar approach was used in France where the regional governments put in public-private partnership agreements to build infrastructure including charging stations (PIA - Programme d'Investissements d'Avenir). 2023 a national investment program was defined, "France 2030", which includes the goal to build 50,000 fast chargers.

In the US, it was noticed that they were falling behind Europe and China. In 2022, a funding program was launched to enable the construction of 500,000 charging points by 2030 with 7.5 billion dollars. 5 billion of that program were earmarked for building fast chargers along the highway network, in what was called the National Electric Vehicle Infrastructure Program, or NEVI for short. For this purpose, nationwide AFC main travel corridors were designated (AFC - alternative fuel corridors). The charging locations of the same provider must be 50 miles apart and within one mile of the highway. Then 80% of the costs can be covered if at least four charging stations with at least 150 kW are set up at the location. The awarding process started slow because there is an application process required that is handled by the individual states, and only a few submissions had been received by the end of 2023. A first NEVI site was commissioned in Ohio in December 2023, with the requirements met by a single EVgo charging station with four connection cables. Four vehicles can charge up to 175 kW, or only a single vehicle can charge at 350 kW.

Technically, NEVI follows the model of Electrify America, which was founded and financed by the Volkswagen Group of America in 2017 after the Dieselgate. There are agreements with California in the ZEVI plan (Zero-Emission Vehicle Investment Plan), which are regularly updated. In "Cycle 2" (July 2019 - December 2021), the requirements for fast chargers were raised - on highway locations they shall have a least four charging points with 150 kW and in some cases allowing 350 kW. The locations should be less than 120 miles (about 190 km) apart. In "Cycle 3" (January 2022 - July 2024) there are estimates of 25-35 charging points with 150 kW and 10-15 charging points with 350 kW to be built. Due to the fulfillment of just the minimum requirements, many stations are located at mall shopping centers in the wider area of a highway, and the availability for actual charging is assessed poorly. This was repeated with the first NEVI stations.

In this setting, Tesla Superchargers achieved a dominant market position in the US after allowing charging for third-party brands from 2020 on. When other vehicle manufacturers finally switched to Tesla#s plug-in system from 2023 (North American Charging System, the Superchargers already held 60% of the market (measured in terms of reported charging points with CCS to NACS - usage even exceeded this). This preconditions created a market opportunity for another fast-charging network, which was founded in the form of Ionna in 2024. This company has a strong overlap with the European Ionity in terms of the founders and the concept.

In Spain the development of public fast chargers is mainly driven by the utility companies which also build charging stations for private owners. Along the motorways it is mostly Iberdrola being active, which received 1 billion Euro through an agreement with BP in 2023 in order to build 11,000 fast chargers, mostly HPC stations. Additionally there is the startup Zunder that started to build HPC chargers. They received funding in 2022 from an investor getting 100 Million Euro (300 million over three years) to build 4.000 fast chargers until 2025 in Spain and partially France.

=== Trend 800 V ===
With the Taycan from 2019, Porsche was the first manufacturer to be able to use the doubled charging speed of the HPC chargers with an on-board architecture of 800 volts - actually it maxed out at 270 kW. However, it turned out that you can also use the doubled charging speed with the already common on-board architecture in 400 volts - if you have the battery pack in two parts and connect them in series. This was first shown by GM with the electric GMC Hummer EV in 2021. Due to its particularly large battery block of 213 kWh, this has been necessary in order to stay under one hour for a full charge on the go. The first electric trucks also used 400 volt battery packs that can be connected in series, as the Mercedes Benz eActross 400 (2022) was able to show. Here too, the size of the battery block of up to 336 kWh is driving development forward.

However, installing a battery management system for several battery packs increases complexity and costs, so that with the increasing availability of HPC networks, all vehicle manufacturers began to develop an on-board architecture in 800 volts. This can be based on electronics from the field of trams and subways, which are nominally designed for 750 volts of traction current, including motors that can tolerate load peaks of up to around 1200 volts. Based on that, there are some start-ups that use the maximum of 1000 volts of the HPC chargers for their vehicles, including Tesla Semi (2022), at the expense of slightly lowering the durability.

In addition to Porsche's innovation, whose 800 V architecture was also used in the Audi e-tron GT (2021), it was Hyundai to develop the E-GMP platform with 800 V early on, which was used in vehicle models from 2021 - Genesis GV60 (2021), Kia EV6 (2021), Hyundai Ioniq 5 (2021), Hyundai Ioniq 6 (2022), Kia EV5 (2023). BYD developed the "E-Platform 3.0" - while the BYD Yuan Plus (2022) still used its 400 V variant in China, the BYD Seal (2023) came with the 800 V variant being sold internationally. Geely developed the Sustainable Experience Architecture (SEA), which was expanded to include an 800 Volt variant, also licensing it to other vehicle manufacturers. Vehicles with the PMA2+ variant were the Geely Galaxy E8 (2023) and Zeekr 007 (2023).

From 2024 onwards, all major manufacturers started switching to 800 volts. Audi and Porsche will use the Volkswagen Group's Premium Platform Electric, that includes Porsche Macan (2024) and Audi Q6 e-tron (2024). BMW showed the "New Class" at the IAA 2023 with new models from 2025. Mercedes Benz is switching to the Mercedes Modular Architecture (MMA), whose electric motors in the "eATS 2.0" series are based on 800 volts. These are also used in the eActross 600 (2024) series.

The spread of 800 V influences the development of fast charging networks. In order to remain future-proof, most HPC charging stations had been designed from the start to support charging voltages of up to 1000 V. However, there are many charging stations types with two or more connection cables that can only be operated at up to 500 volts at the same time - if a vehicle is connected with 800 volts, the other charging points are switched off. With the increasing use of 800-volt architectures, the future charging networks must be designed accordingly, and at the same time they must plan for the increase in load above 500 A. Ionity/Ionna is the operator that ensured from the start that all charging points deliver 350 kW.

=== Beyond 500 kW ===
In China, the development of fast chargers was recognized while the five-year plan 2015–2020 was still running, so they started a cooperation with Chademo in 2018 to specify charging options beyond 500 kW. China's own GB/T plug was specified for a maximum of 237.5 kW (250 A at 950 V), but most of these stations were designed for 50 kW only. Chademo, on the other hand, introduced a new version of its stations with 400 kW in June 2018 - having liquid-cooled cables. The new standard for China and Japan was finally resolved in April 2020 thereby creating a new plug type named ChaoJi. An revision from 2023 did also bring the possibility for 1500 V with 800 A. However, the available vehicles operated with a maximum of 800 V at the time. These had come onto the Chinese market from 2022 and allowed up to 600 A.

Since January 2024, CATL has been supplying 4 C batteries to Chinese vehicle manufacturers, which allow even higher charging currents. In April 2024, a charging current of 546 kW was demonstrated on a Zeekr V3 Supercharger with the Zeekr 001. [49] Accordingly, Zeekr Power is beginning to build a fast-charging network in China with charging stations with a maximum of 800 A and a continuous output of up to 600 kW. 1,000 locations with 10,000 charging points are planned by 2026.

In Europe, Ionity plans to add 600 kW chargers to the network over the next two years starting in 2024.

New designs are required for a further increase – the Megawatt Charging System was designed for 1250 to 3000 A.

== Charging Networks ==
=== Operators ===
China:

- Tesla Supercharger
- State Grid
- ABB Chargedot
- TELD
- Star Charge
- Zeekr Power

Europe:

- Tesla Supercharger
- Ionity
- Aral Pulse
- Shell Recharge
- Allego
- Fastned
- EWE Go (Germany)
- EnBW Mobility+ (Germany)
- Pfalzwerke (Germany)
- Iberdrola (Spain and Portugal)
- Zunder (Spain)

North America:

- Tesla Supercharger
- Ionna
- Electrify America
- Shell Greenlots
- EVgo
- Electrify Canada
- Petro-Canada

=== Statistics ===
At the end of 2022, China had 760,000 fast chargers ready, Europe had 70,000 fast chargers ready, and the United States had 28,000 fast chargers ready.

Biggest operators in the USA by number of charging ports

operator	charging ports (min 50 kW)	charging stations (DC)
Tesla Supercharger	17000	1600
Electrify America	3600	800
EVgo	2200	
ChargePoint	1800	
Greenlots (Shell Recharge)	550	
Francis Energy	530	
January 2023, see overview in US News

Biggest operators in Germany by number of charging ports

operator	charging ports (with CCS)
EnBW mobility+	4871
Tesla Supercharger (only when open for all)	2850
Aral Pulse	1887
EWE Go	1331
Allego	1126
Shell Recharge	946
Pfalzwerke	882
Ionity	831
June 2024, see www.schnellladepark.app
