= Ionna =

North American electric vehicle charging station network

Ionna, LLC
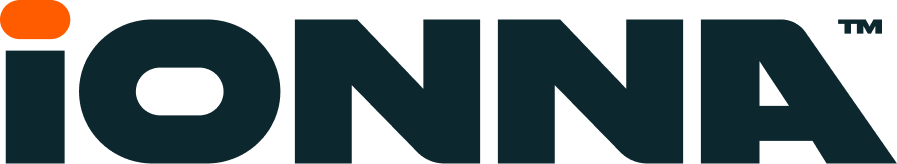
- Trade name: iONNA
- Type: Joint Venture
- Industry: Automotive; infrastructure
- Founded: February 9, 2024; 2 years ago in Torrance, California, United States
- Headquarters: Durham, North Carolina, US
- Number of locations: 107 stations with 1020 stalls (average stalls per site. 9.5) [as of April 11 2026]
- Area served: United States (contiguous)
- Key people: Seth Cutler (CEO); Jackie Slope (CTO)
- Brands: Rechargery; Rechargery Relay; Rechargery @; Rechargery Beacon
- Services: Electric Vehicle Fast Charging
- Owners: BMW; Mercedes-Benz; General Motors; Stellantis; Hyundai; Honda; Kia; Toyota
- Website: ionna.com

Ionna (stylized iONNA) is a high-power charging network for battery electric vehicles in North America formed as a joint venture between several automakers.

== History ==
iONNA was formed in July 2023 as a joint venture between automakers BMW, Mercedes-Benz, General Motors, Stellantis, Hyundai, Honda, and Kia. In July 2024, Toyota joined the venture. The automakers set a goal of electrifying 30,000 new charge points in North America by 2030, which would put iONNA on the same scale as the Electrify America network by Volkswagen and the Supercharger network by Tesla.

In 2024, iONNA officially moved its headquarters to Durham, North Carolina, which is also home to several other EV related companies, such as charge point manufacturer Kempower. The move was expected to yield a $10.1 million investment to the area. The North Carolina Department of Commerce offered a $4.1 million incentive package, and an additional $3.1 million in job grants. That same year iONNA opened its first station in Apex, North Carolina, a "Rechargery" variant. In December, iONNA announced a partnership with Sheetz to electrify 50 co-branded stations by the end of 2026, for a total of 500 charge points.

In February 2025, iONNA announced a secondary goal of 100 stations (1,000 charge points) by the end of 2025, to complement their overall 2030 goal. In July, a second co-branded partnership with U.S. gas station Wawa was inked, expanding the "Rechargery @" variant of stations, where iONNA is not the primary host of the station. With the addition of Wawa, 30,000 charge points were in some stage of planning, construction, or operational by 2030.

As of April 2026 Ionna has 107 stations opened with 1020 stalls. As of October 2026 Ionna had 200 rechargy stations open.

== Charging stations ==
iONNA stations have several different variants which vary in the amenities offered in each location. Their "Rechargery" stations are fully owned and operated by iONNA, and include a drivers lounge, restrooms, refreshments, and additional amenities. "Rechargery Relay" stations are covered and lit stations nearby to other amenities for drivers designed to be a quicker stop to recharge. "Rechargery @" is the name for co-branded stations with third-party hosts such as those at Wawa and Sheetz fuel stations, which is similar to a Rechargery Relay but has a dedicated host. "Rechargery Beacon" is a flagship EV charging destination featuring 20 or more 400 kW charging bays with protective canopies, pull-through stalls, pet areas, restrooms, and Amazon "Just Walk Out" markets. The first Beacon is located in Westminster, California.

All iONNA stations feature Alpitronic HYC400 chargers branded in iONNA teal, featuring a maximum output of 400 kW. Each station is equipped with CCS and NACS connectors and is capable of simultaneous charging on each charge point. The distribution of CCS and NACS connectors varies at each site.

== Gallery ==
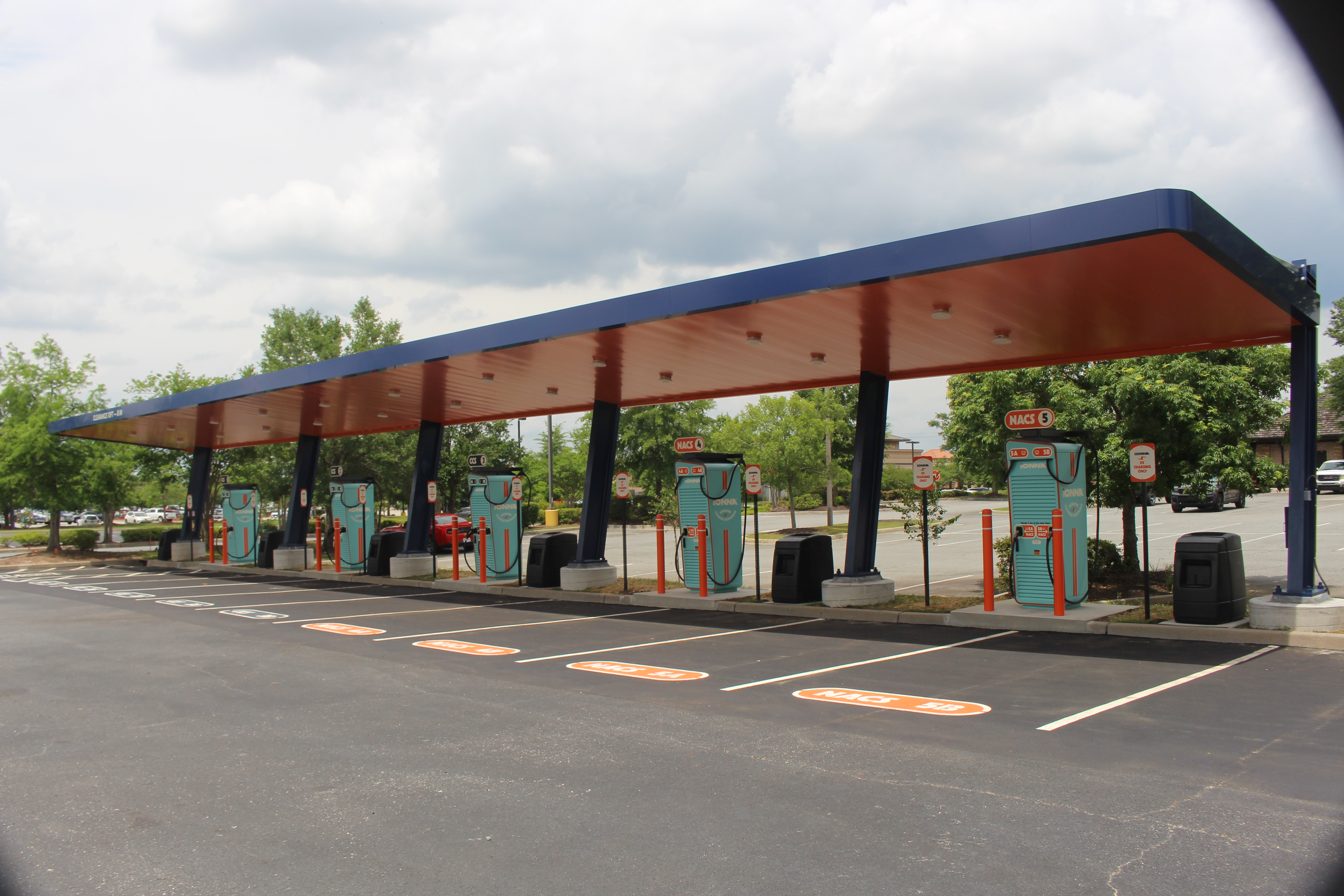
A Rechargery Relay located in Valdosta, Georgia

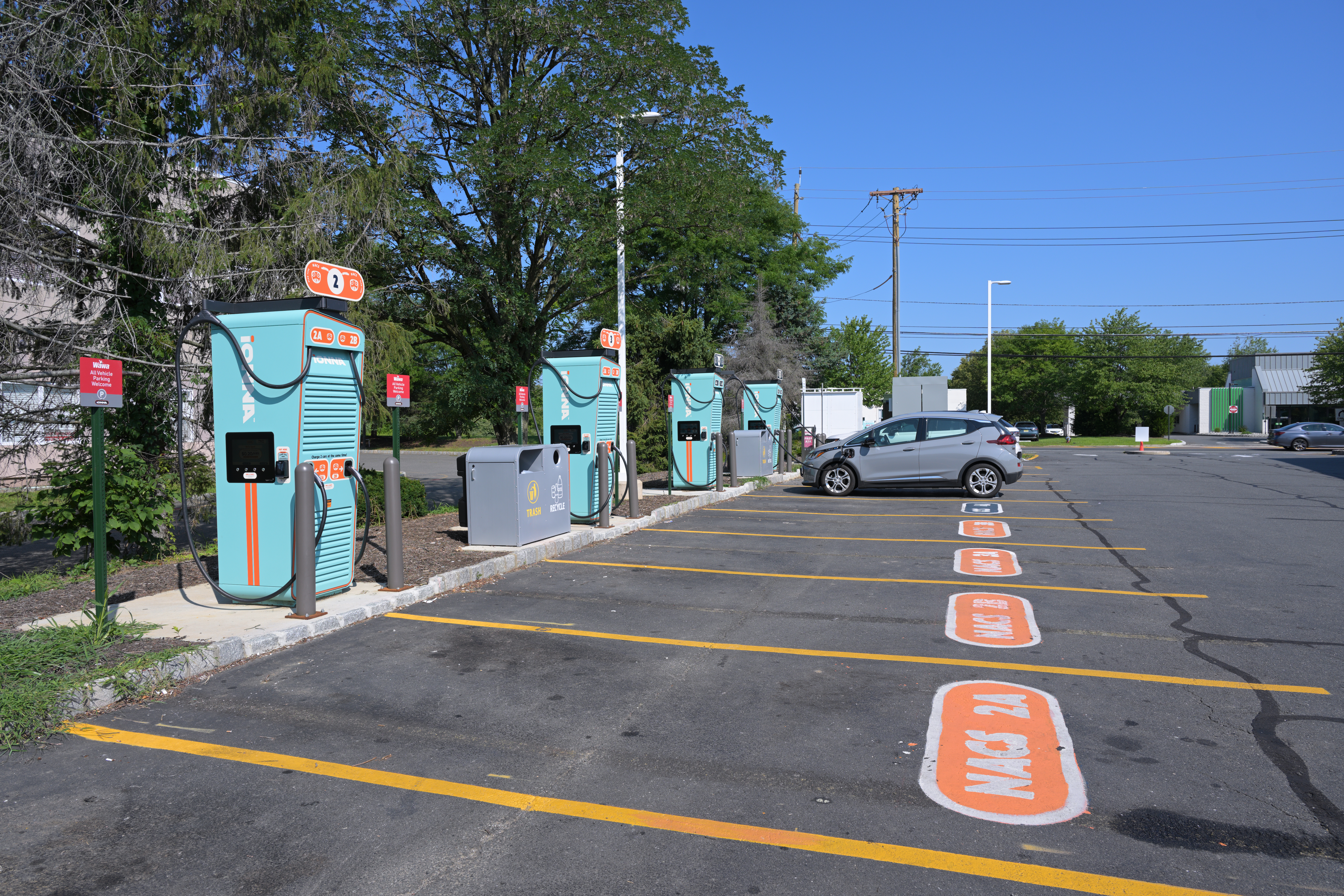
A line of NACS and CCS chargers at a Wawa in Kendall Park, New Jersey

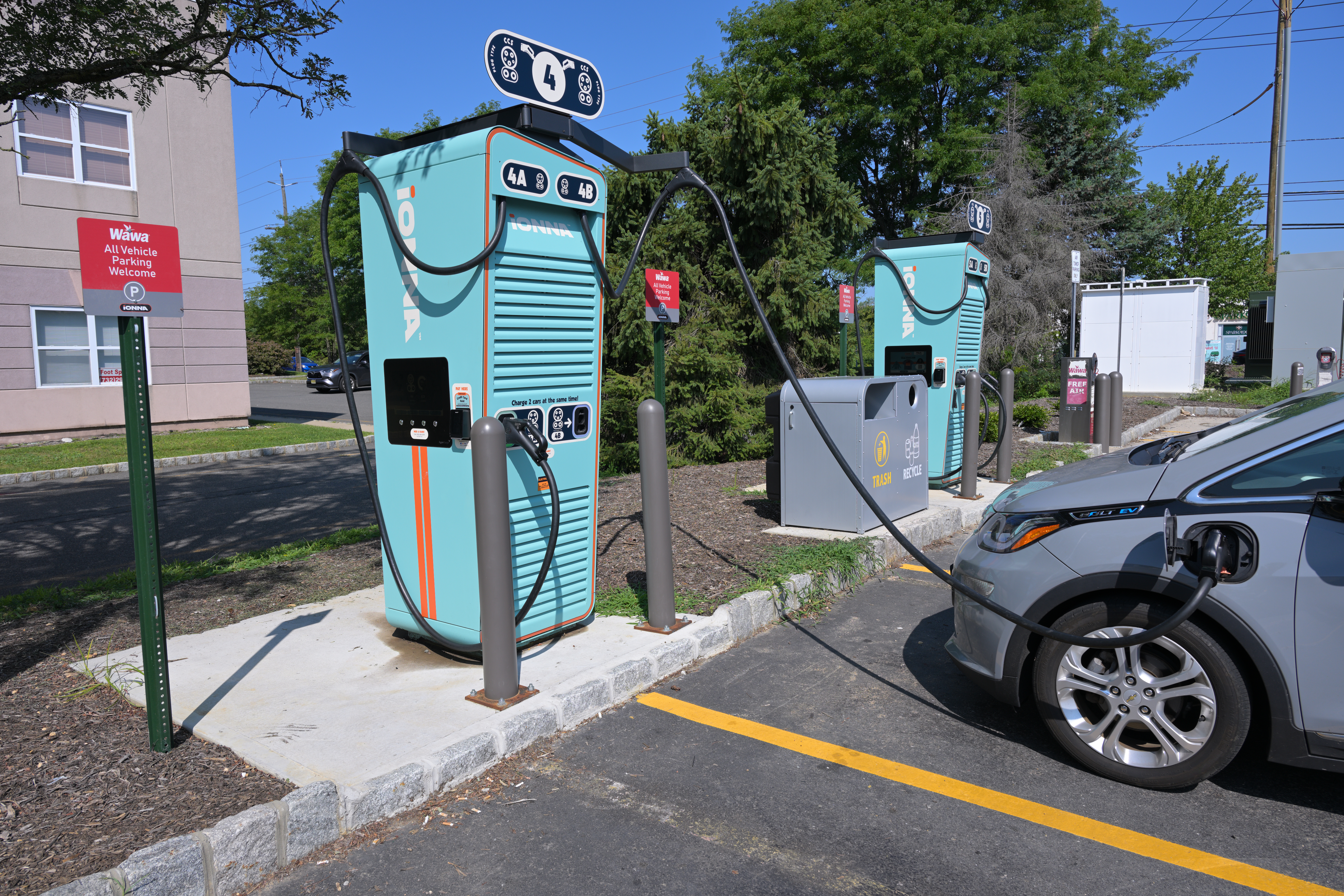
IONNA Alpitronic HYC400 charge point (CCS connector variant) charging a Chevrolet Bolt EV
