= Hypercharger =

Hypercharger may mean:

- Ram-air intake
- A vehicle charger made by Alpitronic
