= IONITY =

Electric vehicle charging station network

- Type: Joint venture
- Industry: Automotive infrastructure
- Headquarters: Munich, Germany
- Area served: Europe
- Key people: Jeroen van Tilburg (CEO), Torsten Kiedel
- Products: Automotive industry
- Owners: BMW Group, Mercedes-Benz Group, Ford Motor Company, Hyundai Motor Group, Volkswagen Group
- Website: Official website

IONITY is a HPC charging network for electric vehicles across 24 countries in Europe. It is a joint venture of the car manufacturers BMW, Ford, Hyundai, Mercedes-Benz, and Volkswagen Group including Audi and Porsche, with BlackRock's Climate Infrastructure Platform as a financial investor. The company's headquarters is in Munich, Germany, with additional offices in Dortmund, outside Norway's capital Oslo and in the French capital Paris. IONITY enables roaming from electric mobility service providers (EMSPs) and offers the Plug & Charge technology for selected vehicles, alongside convenient payment options and subscription offers.

== Charging stations ==
- Charging capacity of up to 400 kW per point
- European charging standard Combined Charging System (CCS)
- Located on major European highways
- Capable of charging certain cars (e.g. Porsche Taycan Hyundai Ioniq 5, Kia EV6) up to 80 percent in just 18 minutes (in ideal conditions).
- Charging stations have from 2 to 24 CCS plugs each, with 6.44 plugs per station on average as of December 2024.
- Charging stations have slightly different design, depending on country and manufacturer.
- Most stations (in 2019) were produced by Tritium and ABB, and some by Porsche itself.
- Roaming EMSP partners include the current member automotive brands, and a range of other mobility providers (Greenflux, Paua, Izivia)

The charging stations have been designed to support at least 350 kW at 800 Volt output. The ABB HP charging stations have a liquid-cooled cable for 500 A (not on the Chademo port), at 400 V it allows for a maximum of 375 A (for 150 kW). The Tritium Veefil PK350 charging stations have a liquid-cooled cable for 500 A, at a maximum of 950 V it allows for a maximum of 355 kW. The Axon Easy 400 charging stations have a liquid-cooled cable for 500 A, at a maximum of 1000 V it allows for a maximum of 400 kW. The Alpitronic Hypercharger HYC400 have a liquid-cooled cable for 500 A (and a 600 A boost), at a maximum of 1000 V it allows for a maximum of 400 kW.

All charging locations have a grid connection that allows to supply all charging points with the maximum power even when fully used. This requires the regular installation of a substation at each location.

The Alpitronic HYC1000 megawatt chargers have a cabinet (power converter station) allowing up to 1000 kW delivering power to up to four stalls with two liquid-cooled cables each, usually having two stalls to ensure high-power charging. Originally developed for the Megawatt Charging System at least one outlet is ensured to get 600 kW of continuous power. It is based on the new generation of CCS plugs and cables allowing up to 800 A continuously.

== Members ==
Current members include BMW Group, Mercedes-Benz Group, Ford Motor Company and Volkswagen Group. In November 2020, Hyundai Motor Group formally joined Ionity after announcing on September 9, 2019, that would bring Hyundai and Kia brands on board as strategic partners.

== Rollout ==
Ionity rollout table: number of open stations per country per quarter.

	2026	2024	2021	2020				2019				2018		
	Q1	Q2	Q1	Q4	Q3	Q2	Q1	Q4	Q3	Q2	Q1	Q4	Q3	Q2
Germany	190	138	100	99	90	88	79	69	53	39	26	21	2	2
France	180	159	75	72	55	46	44	43	26	17	10	5	2	
Austria	30	23	16	16	16	16	16	16	13	11	9	7	2	
Norway	51	40	21	18	18	15	14	13	12	12	6	4		
Sweden	57	39	22	21	20	18	16	14	10	7	3	1		
Switzerland	19	12	10	10	10	9	9	9	8	8	8	6	3	1
Belgium	23	13	9	9	9	7	7	7	7	5	3			
Denmark	14	10	7	7	6	6	6	6	5	5	5	1	1	
Netherlands	21	17	11	10	10	10	9	9	5	2				
United Kingdom	78	29	13	13	11	7	4	3	3	2				
Ireland	7	6	6	6	6	4	4	4	3	1				
Italy	41	36	17	17	12	5	4	2	2	1	1			
Hungary	12	6	5	5	4	4	4	3	2	1				
Slovenia	8	8	5	5	3	2	2	1	1	1				
Finland	27	18	3	3	3	3	3	3						
Spain	43	37	9	8	5	4	2	1						
Czech Republic	9	6	4	2	2	1	1	1						
Croatia	8	5	1	1	1	1	1							
Slovakia	4	2	1	1	1									
Lithuania	3	3	2	2	1									
Estonia	2	2												
Latvia	2	1												
Poland	17	14												
Portugal	16	11												
Total	862	635	336	325	282	248	224	202	150	112	71	45	10	3

=== 2017 ===
The company claimed that a total of 20 stations would open to the public, located on major roads in multiple European countries through partnerships with Tank & Rast, Circle K and OMV. By the end of 2017, no stations were open to the public.

Ionity bid for Europ-e funding from the European Union and was awarded £39.1m to help develop its network, across 13 EU Member States: Austria, Belgium, Denmark, France, Germany, Ireland, Italy, Netherlands, Poland, Portugal, Spain, Sweden, UK.

=== 2018 ===
First Ionity charging station was opened on 24 April 2018 at Brohltal-Ost on the A61 motorway in Germany's Rhineland-Palatinate.

By August 2018, 7 stations were open: 1 in Germany, 1 in Austria, 2 in France, 2 in Switzerland, and 1 in Denmark, with 4-6 chargers on each. 4 more stations are marked as coming soon.

By October 2018, 10 stations with 4-6 CCS charger plugs were open, 20 stations are marked as "now building". Charging cost for the rest of 2018 was established as 8 (€8, or £8, or 8CHF depending on country) per charging session (no power or time restrictions). In Scandinavia the session fee will be 80 NOK / SEK / DKK. The European Union countries currently remaining without published plans for Ionity chargers include: Bulgaria, Croatia, Republic of Cyprus, Czechia, Estonia, Finland, Greece, Hungary, Ireland, Latvia, Lithuania, Luxembourg, Malta, Poland, Portugal, Romania, Slovakia, Slovenia, Spain, and the UK.

By the end of 2018, 47 stations on map are marked open and 45 as now building.

=== 2019 ===
The 100th charging station was open to public in Rygge, Norway on 27 May 2019. On 20 December 2019 200th charging station was completed.

=== 2020 ===
In 2017, Ionity planned to have "implemented and operate about 400 fast charging stations across European major thoroughfares in 2020".

In January 2020, Ionity announced that customers with no contract would be charged 0.79 euros per kWh. The network was criticized for the 500% rate increase for those drivers without a subscription plan. German automakers shared discounted rates for Connected Mobility Service Providers network participants. For example, Mercedes-Benz announced a reduced Ionity charging price of 0.29 euros per charged kilowatt hour for Mercedes' me Charge users.

=== 2021 ===
Operating 336 charging stations with just over 1000 stalls at the end of Q1 2021, the network competes with Tesla supercharger's network with 6000 stalls and 600 stations in Europe at the same time. In August 2021, Volkswagen's CEO Herbert Diess, one of the main partners through Porsche, criticizes Ionity Charging Experience on LinkedIn, pointing that the service is simply not good enough with lack of stations, stalls, toilets, and refreshments, and with charging points out of service. "simply not premium".

At the end of 2021 the network operated 401 charging stations with 1690 charging points.

=== 2022 ===
At the end of 2022 the network operated 453 charging stations with 2068 charging points.

=== 2023 ===
At the end of 2023 the network operated 594 charging stations with 3306 charging points.

=== 2024 ===
The network operated 684 charging stations with 4359 charging points in 24 European countries by October 2024.

The goal is to have 1000 charging stations with 9000 charging points by 2027.

May 13th Jeroen van Tilburg has taken over the role as CEO. He replaced Michael Hajesch pursuing other ventures outside the company.

IONITY has been awarded as the most efficient HPC network in the elvah Comprehensive Charging Market Report for Germany, I.2024 with charging stations located every 120 kilometers across Europe.

The charging provider is recognized by Auto Bild and eMobility Excellence as the CPO with the highest charging point quality.

The company has reached the first place among all tested fast charging providers in 2024 in a Report by Auto Club Europa.

=== 2025 ===
The company will install the first HYC1000 Megawatt chargers in the second half of 2025. The goal is a comprehensive network allowing for 600 kW charging.

The company has secured an additional loan of 600 million Euro for that.
