= Electrify Canada =

Electric vehicle charging network in Canada

- Company type: Corporation
- Industry: Electric vehicle infrastructure
- Founded: May 10, 2018; 7 years ago
- Area served: Canada
- Key people: Robert Barrosa (President & CEO)
- Products: Electric vehicle chargers
- Owners: Electrify America, Volkswagen Group
- Website: electrify-canada.ca

Electrify Canada is a corporation formed by Electrify America and Volkswagen Group to build electric vehicle (EV) direct current (DC) charging infrastructure in Canada.

== Overview ==
Electrify Canada was established by Electrify America and Volkswagen Group in 2018. While Electrify America was originally formed due to the Volkswagen emissions scandal settlement, Electrify Canada was a strategic decision to support VW's EV Sales in the country. The company opened its first charging station in September 2019.

The company has over 204 chargers at 45 charging stations across Nova Scotia, New Brunswick, Quebec, Ontario, Alberta, British Columbia, and Saskatchewan as of March 2025.

Electrify Canada stations offer charging speeds between 150 kW to 350 kW. The company offers both Combined Charging System (CCS) and CHAdeMO connectors at their charging stations. In 2023 the company announced it would begin offering Tesla's North American Charging System connectors, in addition to the existing connectors, by 2025.

In December 2023, Electrify Canada announced it would begin billing users by kWh instead of by the amount of time used.

== See also ==
- Electrify America
- Electric vehicle charging network
- Charging station
- IONITY
