= Philippe Zaouati =

French businessman

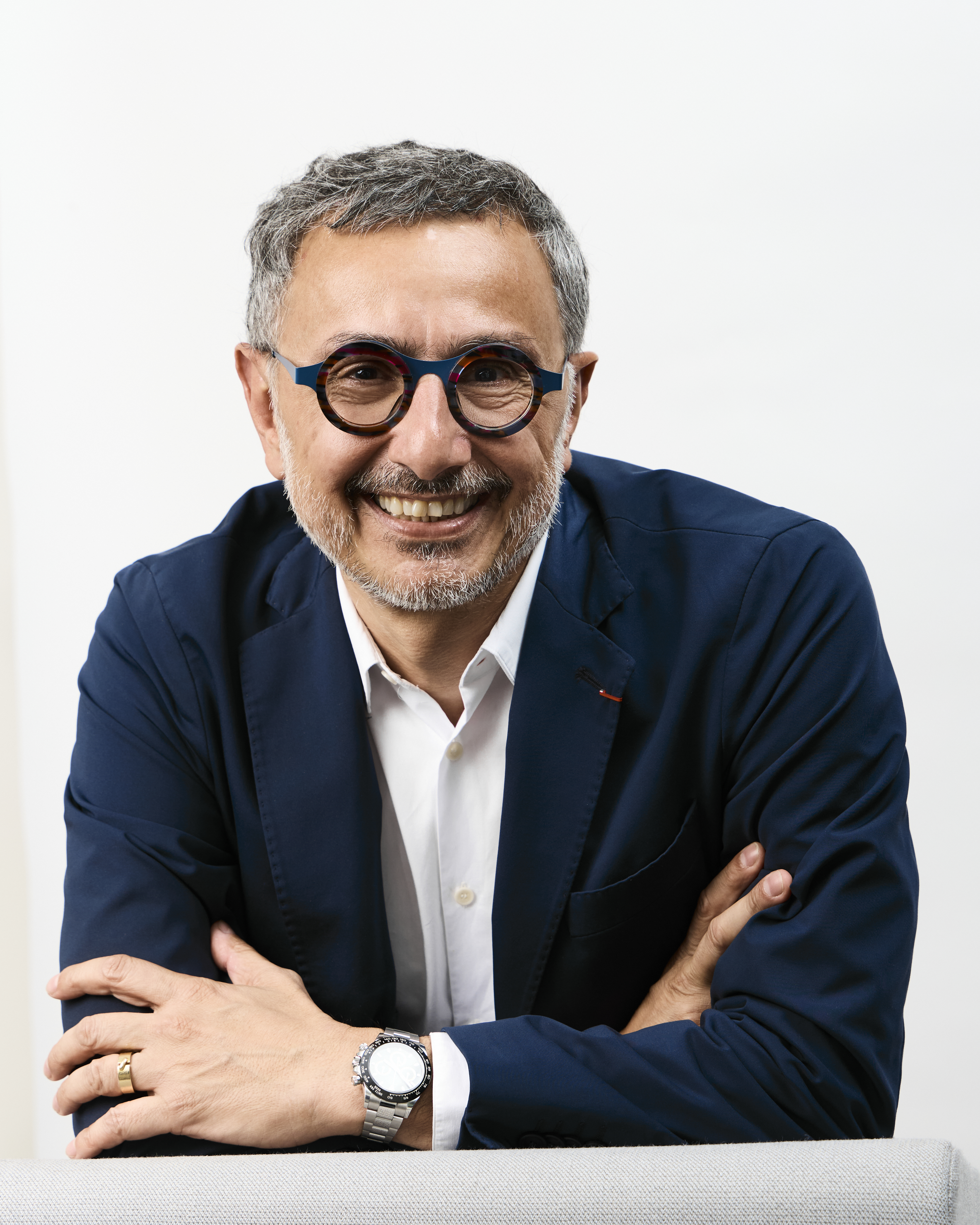
- Born: June 1966 (age 60); Marseille, France
- Education: ENSAE Paris
- Occupations: Businessperson, writer, economist
- Known for: Specialist in green and sustainable finance
- Awards: Ordre national du Mérite

Philippe Zaouati is a French businessperson, writer, and specialist in green and sustainable finance. He is also the managing director of Mirova, an asset management company specializing in sustainable investment, which he created within Natixis in 2014.

== Early life and education ==
Philippe Zaouati was born in Marseille in June 1966. His father was born in Algiers, and his mother in Oran. Zaouati attended primary and secondary school in Marseille's northern suburbs before taking scientific preparatory classes at the Lycée Thiers. In 1983, he was runner-up in the History Concours Général. In 1989, he graduated from the National School of Statistics and Economic Administration in Paris (ENSAE) and became a member of the French Institute of Actuaries.

== Career ==
Philippe Zaouati began his career in finance in 1989 as a Quantitative Portfolio Manager at BIP Gestion, a subsidiary of Dresdner Bank, which Allianz Global Investors later acquired. In 1992, he joined Caisse des Dépôts as a Financial Engineer for the Asset Management division, contributing to strategic asset allocation, enhanced money market products, and quantitative asset management. In 1994, he published a reference work on quantitative management (“La Gestion quantitative”, Éditions Economica). In 1995, Zaouati joined Sogeposte (now La Banque Postale Asset Management) as Head of Product Development. From 1998 to 2007, he worked at Crédit Agricole Asset Management, initially as Head of Product Development (1998–2000). He subsequently became CEO of the Luxembourg branch dedicated to investment management (2000–2007) and CEO and then Chairman of Fund Channel, a third-party distribution platform (2002–2007). In 2002, he was appointed Head of Client Services, and in 2006, he became Head of Marketing & Communication.

In 2007, Zaouati was appointed Deputy CEO and a Member of the executive committee of Natixis Asset Management, responsible for Business Development. In 2012, he founded Mirova, a division dedicated to responsible investment within Natixis Asset Management. In 2014, Mirova was established as a subsidiary of Natixis Asset Management to develop its sustainable investment activities, with Philippe Zaouati as CEO. In 2020, he takes the initiative of creating the corporate foundation Mirova Foundation dedicated to environmental and social impact of which he is chairman.

From 2012 to 2014, he served as a board member of the International Corporate Governance Network. In 2012, he was Chairman of the European Fund and Asset Management Association (EFAMA) Responsible Investment Working Group and the Association Française de la Gestion financière (French Association of Asset Management) Socially Responsible Investment Commission. From 2013 to 2016, he chaired the Investment Leaders Group at the Cambridge Institute for Sustainability Leadership (CISL).

Between 2016 and 2018, Zaouati was a member of the High Level Expert Group on Sustainable Finance, which provided recommendations for the European Union's strategy on sustainable finance as part of the Capital Markets Union. From 2017 to 2019, he co-founded and chaired Finance for Tomorrow (now Institut de la finance durable), a branch of Paris Europlace created to promote sustainable finance in France and abroad. In 2018, along with Pascal Canfin, he delivered a report commissioned by the French Ministries of Economy and Energy Transition, describing mechanisms for mobilizing €10 billion in private investment to finance the ecological transition.

From 2021 to 2023, Zaouati served as a board member of Communauté des entreprises à mission, and from 2022 to 2024, he was a board member of Mouvement Impact France. From 2021 to 2023, he was chair of the Mission Committee at Colombus Consulting. Additionally, he is a board member of WWF France since 2020, and a member of the Investment Committee of Natural History Museum Foundation. In 2023, he joined the International Advisory Panel on Biodiversity Credits.

From 2019 to 2022, he taught sustainable finance at Sciences Po.

== Political activism ==
In 1995, Philippe Zaouati was a candidate for the municipal elections in Boulogne-Billancourt. In 1998, he ran for the departmental elections in Bourg-la-Reine and Antony (Hauts-de-Seine) as a former Socialist Party member. In 2016, he joined En Marche (now Renaissance) and contributed to drafting Emmanuel Macron's first presidential program on the environment. In 2018, he founded the think-tank “Osons le Progrès” to reflect on the notion of progressivism. In 2021, before the presidential elections, he co-founded “L’Union fait le Climat”, a coalition led by a group of La République en Marche (now Renaissance) members to advocate for a second term for Emmanuel Macron focused on climate and biodiversity.

== Published works ==
=== Essays ===
- Positive Finance, a toolkit for responsible transformation, by Philippe Zaouati and Hervé Guez. Foreword by Jacques Attali. Published by Rue de l’Échiquier. 2014. ISBN 978-1-78353-455-5. The original French version of the book has been awarded the Social and Solidarity Economy Book Prize in 2015.
- Paris, the kilometer zero of green finance. Published by Rue de l’Échiquier. 2018. ISBN 978-2-37425-140-0
- Finance durable: l'heure de la seconde chance (Sustainable finance: time for a second chance). Published by Éditions de l'Observatoire. 2020. ISBN 979-10-329-1727-5
- La finance face aux limites planétaires, dialogue entre un philosophe et un financier (Finance in the face of planetary limits, a dialogue between a philosopher and a financier). A dialogue between Dominique Bourg and Philippe Zaouati conducted by Anne-Cécile Bras. Published by Actes Sud. 2023. ISBN 978-2-330-17868-0

=== Novels ===
- La Fumée qui Gronde. Published by Arhsens éditions. 2011. ISBN 978-2-916236-14-8
- Naufrages. Published by L’Éditeur À Part. 2024 (first published in 2014 by éditions des Rosiers. 2014). ISBN 978-2-494780-09-5
- Perelman's Refusal: A Novel. Publisher: American Mathematical Society. 2017. ISBN 978-1-4704-6304-5
- Applaudissez-moi. Published by édition Pippa. 2020. ISBN 978-2-37679-046-4
- State of the Union. Published by Le Métier des mots. 2022. ISBN 978-2-494029-04-0

== Distinctions ==
Philippe Zaouati was ordered Knight of the National Order of Merit in 2017.
