= Allego =

- Type: Besloten vennootschap
- Traded as: ALLG
- Industry: EV charging
- Founded: September 2013; 12 years ago
- Headquarters: Arnhem, Netherlands
- Website: allego.eu

Allego is the operator of a fast charging network for electric cars based in the Netherlands.

== History ==
The company was founded in September 2013 under the name Alliander Mobility Services as a subsidiary of Alliander NV from Arnhem, a utility company, and renamed to Allego in June 2014. The parent company had been active in Berlin since 2006 with its Stadtlicht GmbH. Through this mainstay, Allego won a tender from the state of Berlin to operate the EV charging stations in January 2015. The corresponding contracts with Allego GmbH were extended in 2019.

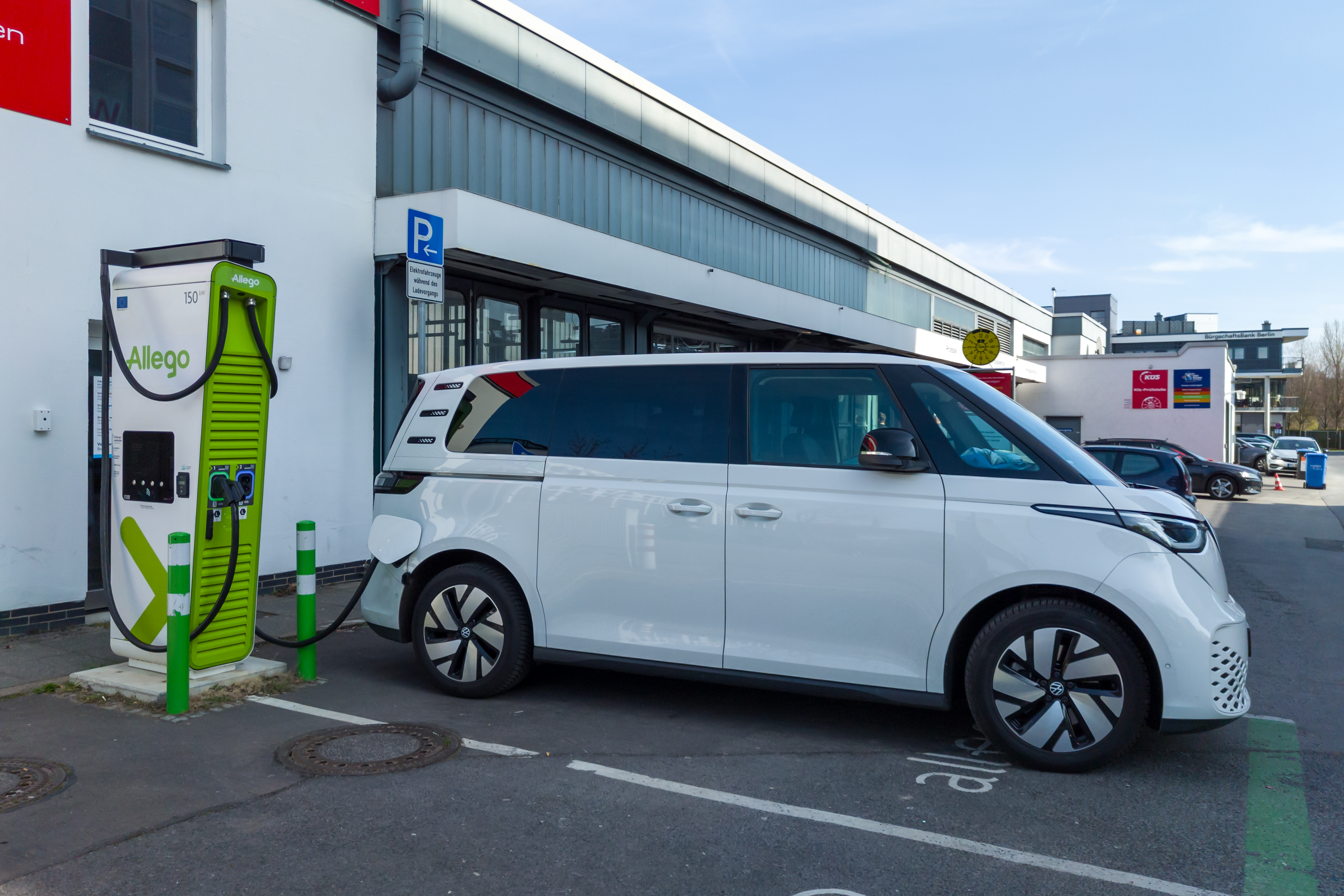
Allego DC charging station in Berlin

In autumn 2015, Allego began building a network of fast-charging stations along German motorways. In 2016, Allego took over the construction of 40 fast chargers with 50 kW in the "Fast-E" project with funding from the EU. In January 2018, Allego presented the "Mega-E" project, again using EU funding, to build an HPC charging network with 322 locations and 27 e-charging hubs. A total of 1,300 HPC charging points with up to 350 kW were to be built by 2025. From 2021, Allego also began converting the "Fast-E" locations to HPC charging stations. However, the sites had already been prepared for 350 kW. In July 2022, Allego exercised a purchase option on the 100 locations with 770 fast chargers that had already been built.

Allego was sold to a French infrastructure fund, Meridiam, on May 31, 2018. In April 2020, it was announced that every second job at Allego would be cut. Since then, it has been listed on the New York Stock Exchange (NYSE) through a merger with a SPAC.
