= Zeekr Power =

Fast charging company

Zeekr Power builds and operates a fast charging network for electric cars from Zeekr.

== History ==
The Zeekr company was founded by Chinese company Geely, also owning the Swedish Volvo, as an electric car brand that shall compete against Nio and Tesla in the premium segment. With the launch of Zeekr's first vehicle model in 2021, the company also offered wall boxes and a charging card app so that the vehicle can be charged at home and on the go.

In addition to cooperation with other charging networks, the Zeekr Power department began setting up its own charging stations, which follow a uniform concept similar to Tesla Supercharger sites, beinge equipped with self-developed hardware to enable Zeekr vehicles to have short charging stops. In March 2022 there were 38 charging stations built in 20 cities. Zeekr Power aims to be able to offer a network of 1,000 charging stations by 2024 in China, and by 2026 there should be at least a thousand locations with at least ten thousand charging stations.

In March 2024, Nio announced that they participate in Zeekr's charging network and that there would be a cooperation with Geely's E-Energie on the battery swap stations as well. This follows the latest Nio model, which, like Zeekr's latest model, exceeds the previously usual HPC station's maximum of 350 kW. In April 2024, the Zeekr 001 was able to demonstrate a charging current of 546 kW on a Zeekr V3 Supercharger.

== Zeekr Charge ==
Zeekr Charge is Zeekr Power's charging card app.

In Europe Zeekr Charge offers access to the stations from Plugsurfing.

== Supercharger ==
By March 2022, 20 locations in China had been built with Zeekr V1 Superchargers with a maximum of 360 kW.

In June 2022, the construction of Zeekr V2 Superchargers began, which can now deliver a maximum of 600 kW (600 A at 1000 V). Charging stations from the Geely subsidiary VREMT are used. (News-Viridi Energy Mobility Technology). By the end of 2023, 401 charging stations (with V1 and V2) had been built.

In December 2023, the Zeekr V3 Superchargers were introduced, which can now deliver a maximum of 800 kW. The V3 Supercharger achieves a maximum of 800 A with a maximum of 1000 V for a maximum of 600 kW continuous output per liquid-cooled charging cable.
