= Zunder =

Spanish electric vehicle charger network operator

- Industry: EV charging
- Founded: September 2017; 9 years ago
- Founder: Daniel Pérez; Lorenzo Antolín
- Headquarters: Palencia, Spain
- Key people: Daniel Pérez (CEO)
- Website: zunder.com

Zunder is a Spanish company headquartered in Palencia that operates an ultra-fast charging network for electric vehicles in Spain, France and Portugal.

Zunder ultra-fast charging station in Narros del Castillo, Ávila

== History ==
Zunder was founded in Palencia, Spain, in 2017 under the name EasyCharger by Daniel Pérez and Lorenzo Antolín. It initially developed software to manage charging points before building its own charging stations, and adopted the Zunder name in 2022.

In 2022, they received 100 million euros from the French investor Mirova. In February 2023, they received 40 million euros from the European Investment Bank to build HPC chargers in cohesion regions.

In July 2024, the company secured a €225 million green loan from Banco Santander to expand its network.

By the end of 2025, the company operated 209 charging stations with more than 1,300 charge points in Spain, France and Portugal.

In 2026, Zunder launched KAWAT, a software platform that offers its charging-management technology to third-party operators.
