= Mirova (company) =

Global asset management company

- Type: Private
- Industry: Investment Management
- Founded: 2012
- Headquarters: Paris, France
- Area served: Europe, APAC, North America, Africa, Latin America
- Key people: Philippe Zaouati (CEO); Guillaume Abel (Deputy CEO); Anne-Laurence Roucher (Deputy CEO)
- Total assets: €28.4 billion (Q3 2023)
- Number of employees: > 200
- Subsidiaries: Mirova US LLC; Mirova UK Ltd; Mirova SunFunder Inc.
- Website: www.mirova.com

Mirova is a global asset management company dedicated to sustainable investment and an affiliate of Natixis Investment Managers. As of September 30, 2023, Mirova and its affiliates manage €28.4 billion. The company is a mission-driven and labeled B Corp.

Mirova's headquarters are in Paris, France. The company is also present in London, Boston, Nairobi, Singapore and Luxembourg.

== History ==
Mirova, initially established as a department within Ostrum Asset Management (formerly Natixis Asset Management), was founded in 2012 by Philippe Zaouati. In 2014, Mirova evolved into a direct affiliate of Natixis Investment Managers. In 2015, the company launched one of the first global strategies for green bonds and developed a new methodology for measuring the carbon footprints of all Mirova investments.

In 2017, Mirova acquired a majority stake in Althelia, an investment platform dedicated to the sustainable management of natural capital, encompassing both land and marine resources.

In 2019, the company finalized the acquisition of Mirova Natural Capital, now Mirova UK Ltd (previously known as Althelia Ecosphere), established Mirova US LLC as a wholly owned subsidiary, and launched a gender diversity equity strategy.

In 2020, Mirova became a mission-driven company under French law, which involves defining a "raison d'être" and setting social, societal, or environmental objectives beyond profit. For the fourth year in a row, Mirova and its natural capital platform were included in the ImpactAssets 50 ("IA 50") list.

The same year, Mirova earned the B Corp certification. Additionally, Mirova began developing a methodology to analyze the impact of listed investments on biodiversity.

In 2021, Mirova introduced an impact private equity strategy. The same year, Mirova was acknowledged as "Responsible investor of the year" and received the "Social investing initiative of the year" award. At the same time, the company was named "Real assets manager of the year" and "Renewables fund of the year".

In 2022, the company acquired SunFunder, a specialist in emerging market clean energy and climate investment based in Nairobi, Kenya. This acquisition was accompanied by the expansion of the fixed income range with the launch of two new strategies.

Also, Mirova's equity funds received high ratings from Climetrics, with 11 funds earning a 5-leaf rating in 2022. The company also ranked highly in the Trophées de la Finance Responsible and Grand Prix de la Finance 2022 (H24), including first place in the ESG Favorite Companies category.

In 2023, Mirova launched its sixth strategy dedicated to energy transition infrastructure, with a fundraising target of up to €2 billion, as well as a second strategy dedicated to sustainable land use. The same year, Mirova and Robeco launched a market initiative to develop global database of avoided emissions factors and associated company-level avoided emissions.

Mirova received a special commendation at the Funds Europe Awards in the "European Fixed Income Fund Manager of the Year" category.

== Notable people ==
- Philippe Zaouati (born 1966), managing director of Mirova
