= Zeekr 001 =

Battery electric car

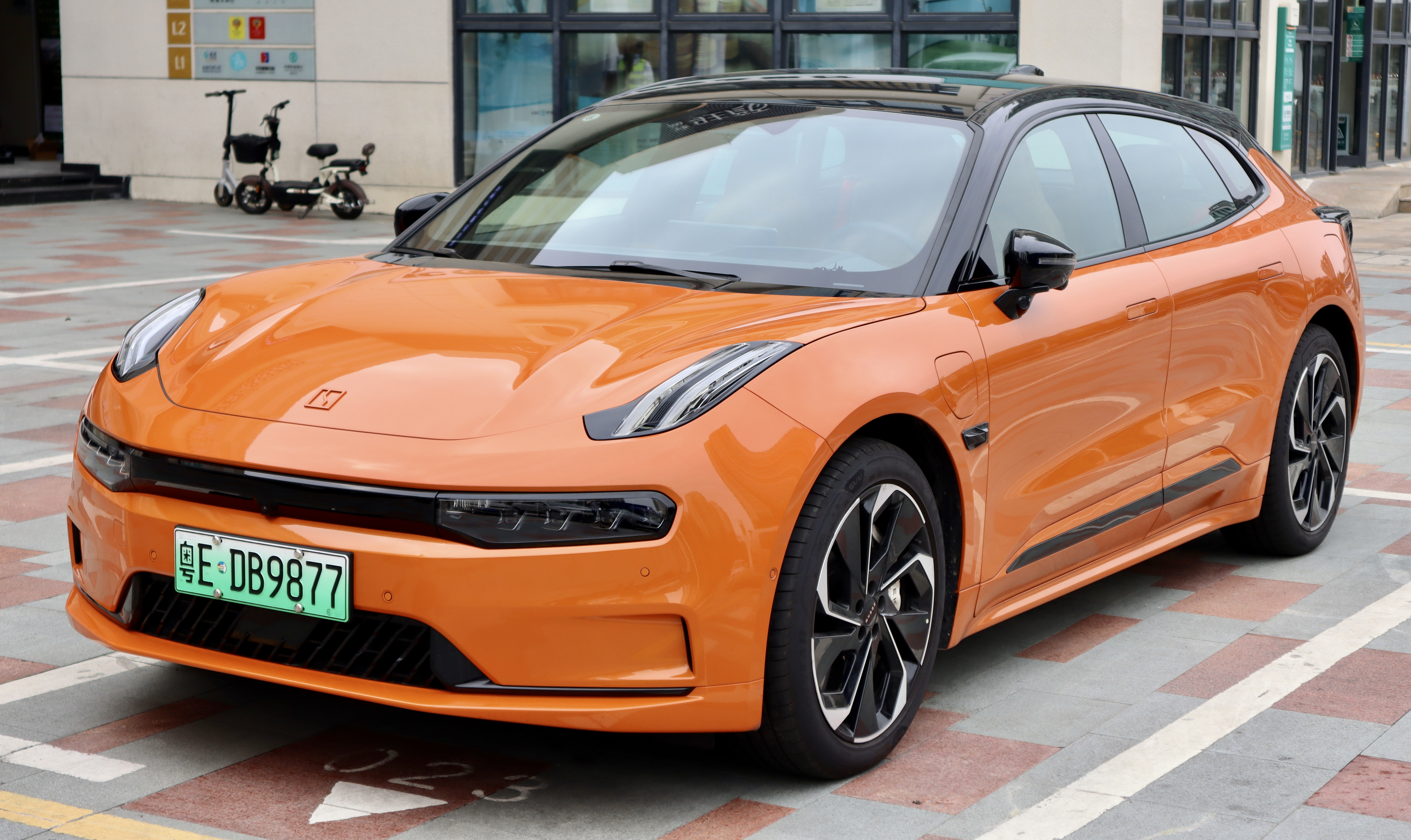

Overview
- Manufacturer: Zeekr (Geely Auto)
- Production: October 2021 – present
- Assembly: China: Ningbo
- Designer: Chris Chen

Body and chassis
- Class: Executive car (E)
- Body style: 5-door shooting brake
- Layout: Rear-motor, rear-wheel drive; Dual-motors, all-wheel-drive; Quad-motors four-wheel drive, Individual wheel drive (001 FR)
- Platform: SEA1 platform
- Related: Polestar 4 Ji Yue 01; Lotus Eletre; Lynk & Co Z10

Powertrain
- Electric motor: Permanent Magnet Synchronous motors
- Power output: (RWD); 272 PS (268 hp; 200 kW) peak; 90 PS (89 hp; 66 kW) 30 min maximum; (AWD); 544 PS (537 hp; 400 kW) peak; 180 PS (180 hp; 130 kW) 30 min maximum; 1,265 PS (1,248 hp; 930 kW) peak (001 FR)
- Transmission: 1-speed direct-drive
- Battery: CATL Qilin Battery; 86 kWh (310 MJ); 100 kWh (360 MJ); 140 kWh (500 MJ)
- Range: up to 1,032 km (641 mi)
- Plug-in charging: V2L: 3.3 kW

Dimensions
- Wheelbase: 3,000 mm (118.1 in)
- Length: 4,970 mm (195.7 in)
- Width: 1,990 mm (78.3 in)
- Height: 1,560 mm (61.4 in)
- Curb weight: 2,225–2,350 kg (4,905–5,181 lb)

The Zeekr 001 (Chinese: 极氪 001; pinyin: Jíkè 001) is a battery electric car marketed by Zeekr since 2021 as the first vehicle from the brand. Originally designed as a Lynk & Co vehicle, the model was instead released under Zeekr, at the time a new electric vehicle brand under Geely Holding.

== Overview ==
The vehicle was originally previewed at the 2020 Beijing Auto Show as the Lynk & Co Zero Concept. The production 001 was presented on 16 April 2021 at the Auto Shanghai. In October 2021, the model was released in the Chinese market.

Based on the Sustainable Experience Architecture platform, its shooting brake design is similar to the Porsche Panamera Sport Turismo and it features a similar front end as Lynk & Co models. The 001 is claimed to be the world's first mass-produced EV shooting brake.

The 001 went on sale in Europe in 2023.

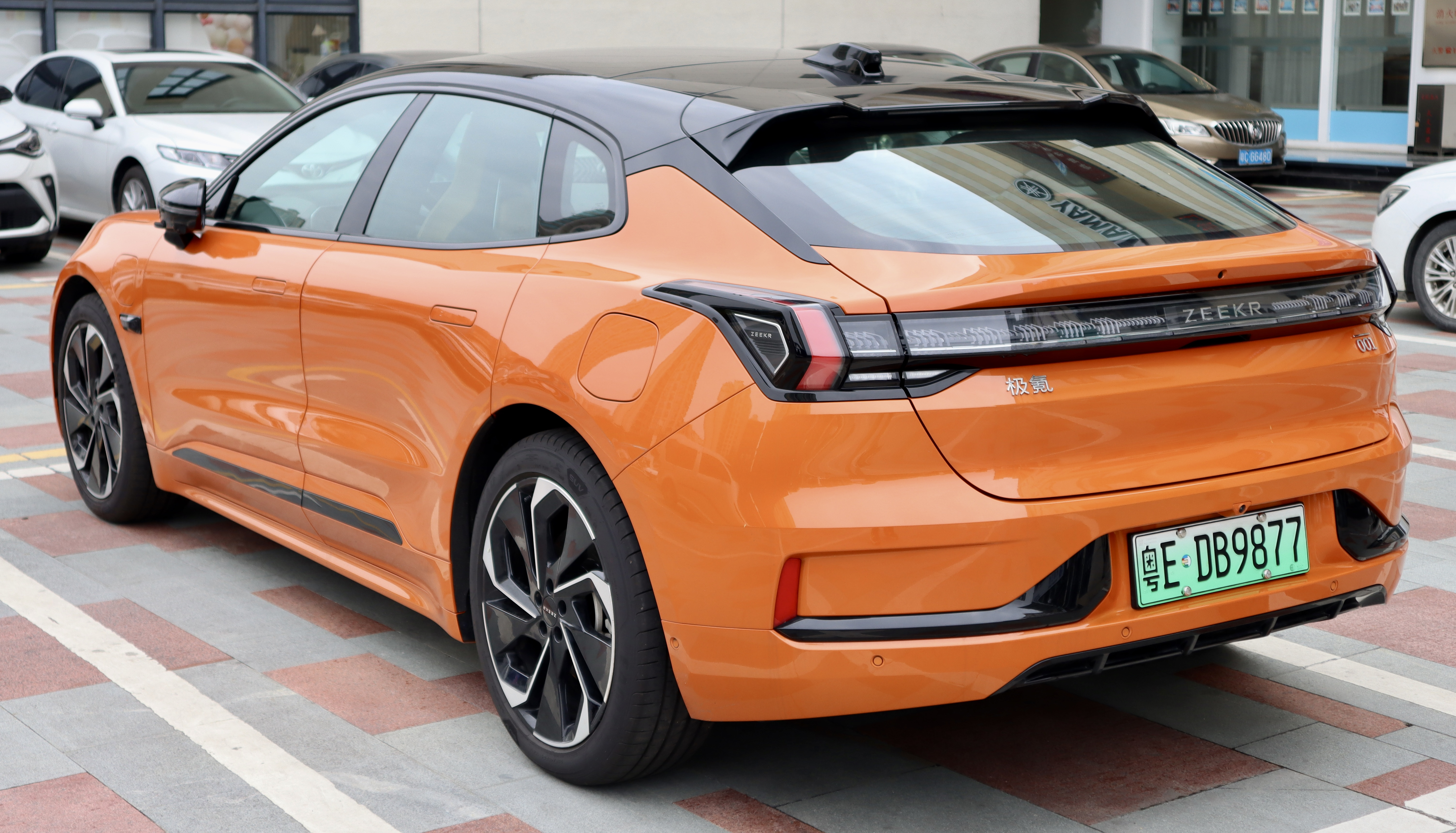
Rear view

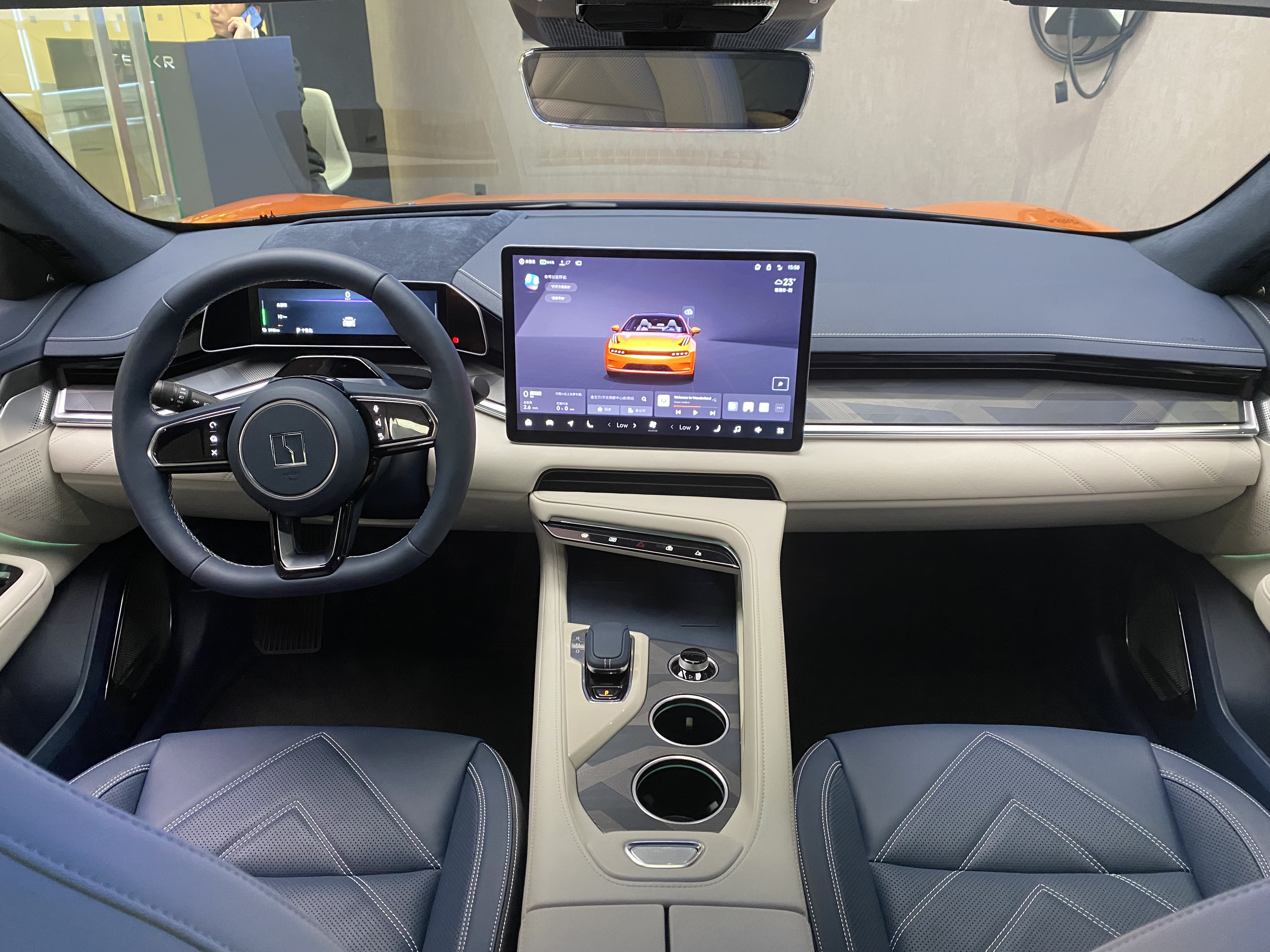
Interior

== Performance ==
The top-tier Zeekr 001 variant features dual electric motors on the front and rear axles, delivering a combined output of 536 hp (400 kW; 543 PS) and 700 N⋅m (516 lb⋅ft) of torque. It accelerates from 0–100 km/h (0–62 mph) in 3.8 seconds, reaches a top speed of over 200 km/h (124 mph), and has a sustained maximum power output of 177 hp (132 kW; 179 PS) for 30 minutes.

Zeekr claims the 001 can achieve a range of up to 700 km (435 mi) on a full charge, with its charging system providing 120 km (75 mi) of range in just five minutes. In 2023, a special edition limited to 1,000 units was released, equipped with a 140 kWh CATL Qilin battery, enabling a range of up to 1,000 km (621 mi).

== 2023 model ==
In January 2023, the upgraded 2023 model Zeekr 001 was announced. The 2023 model replaced the Japanese Denso motors with Chinese VREMT motors. VREMT (Viridi E-Mobility Technology) is a subsidiary of Zeekr's parent company Geely. Upgraded Zeekr 001 offers an option for 140 kWh CATL Qilin batteries, with a maximum range that can exceed 1,000 kilometers.

== 2024 model ==
In February 2024, the Zeekr 001 underwent a significant update, adopting an exterior design inspired by the 001 FR performance variant revealed earlier. The interior system features the Zeekr OS 6.0 system, a 15.05 inch 2.5K OLED centre screen and a 35.5 inch AR-HUD. The platform now supports 800V high voltage charging system with battery options including a 95 kWh and 100 kWh battery. Ranges could go up to 675km, 705km, and 750km based on different trim levels. The model was shown to reach 546 kW charging speed at a Zeekr V3 Supercharger.

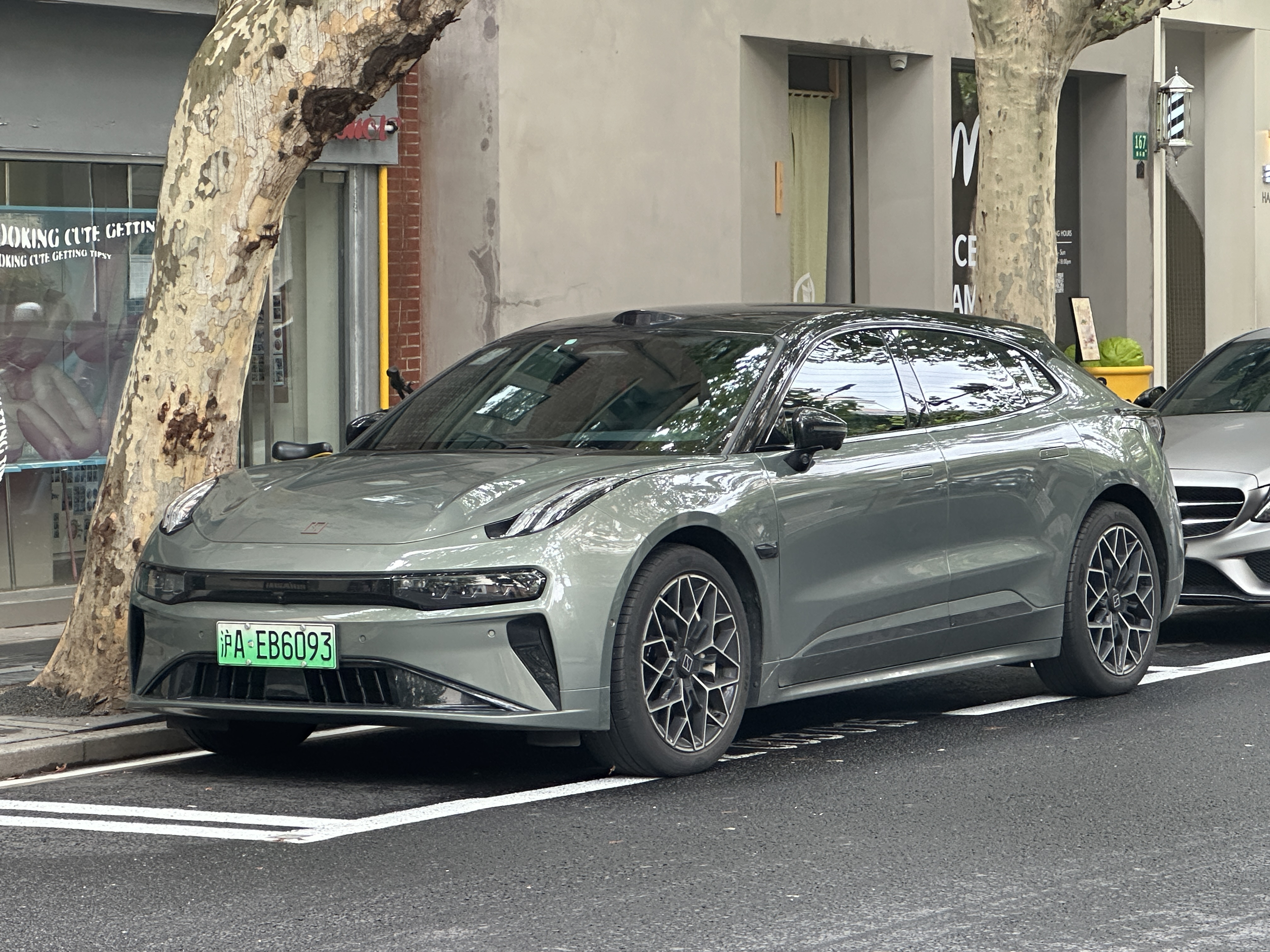
Zeekr 001 (facelift)

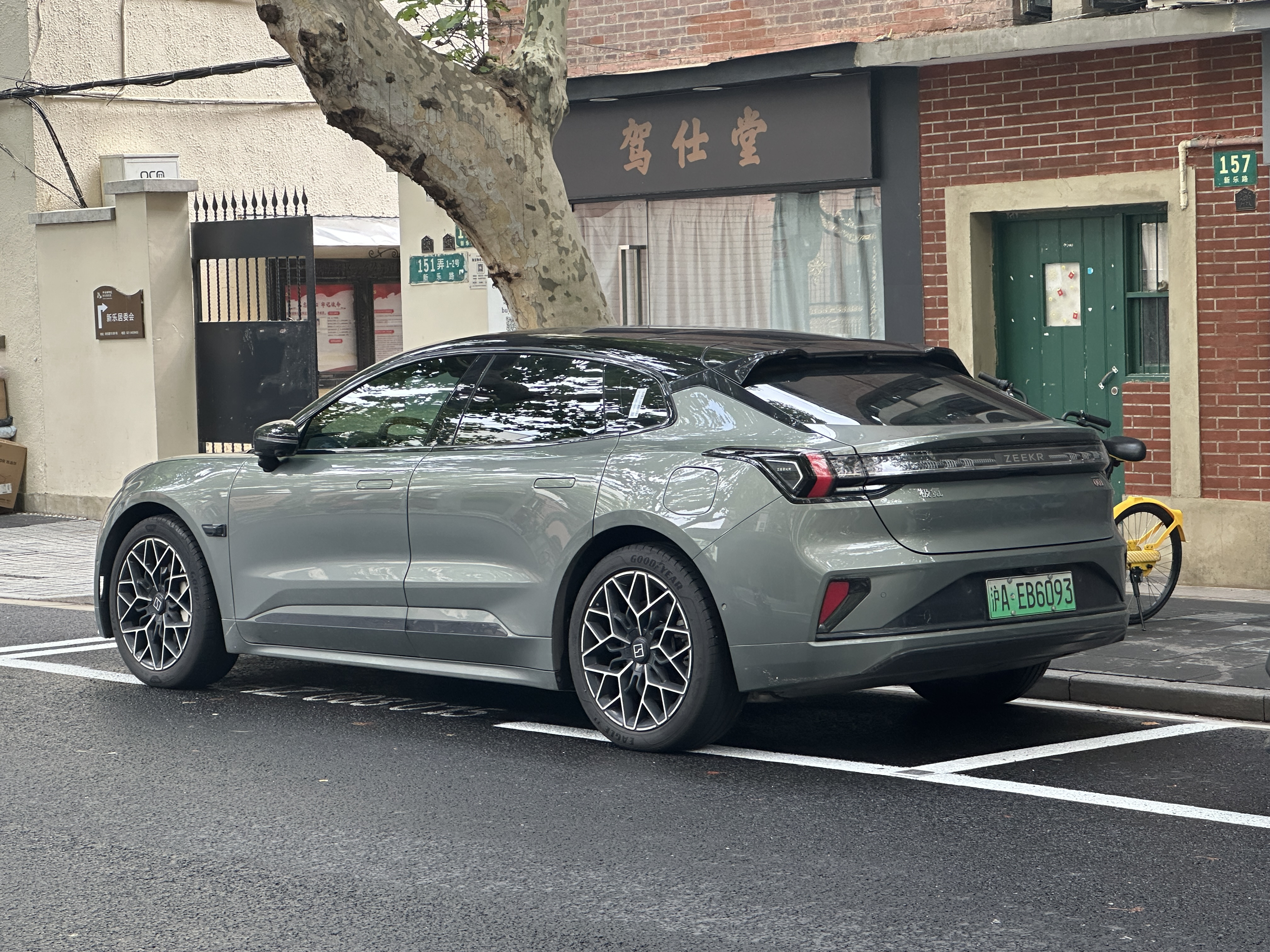
Rear view (facelift)

== 2025 model ==
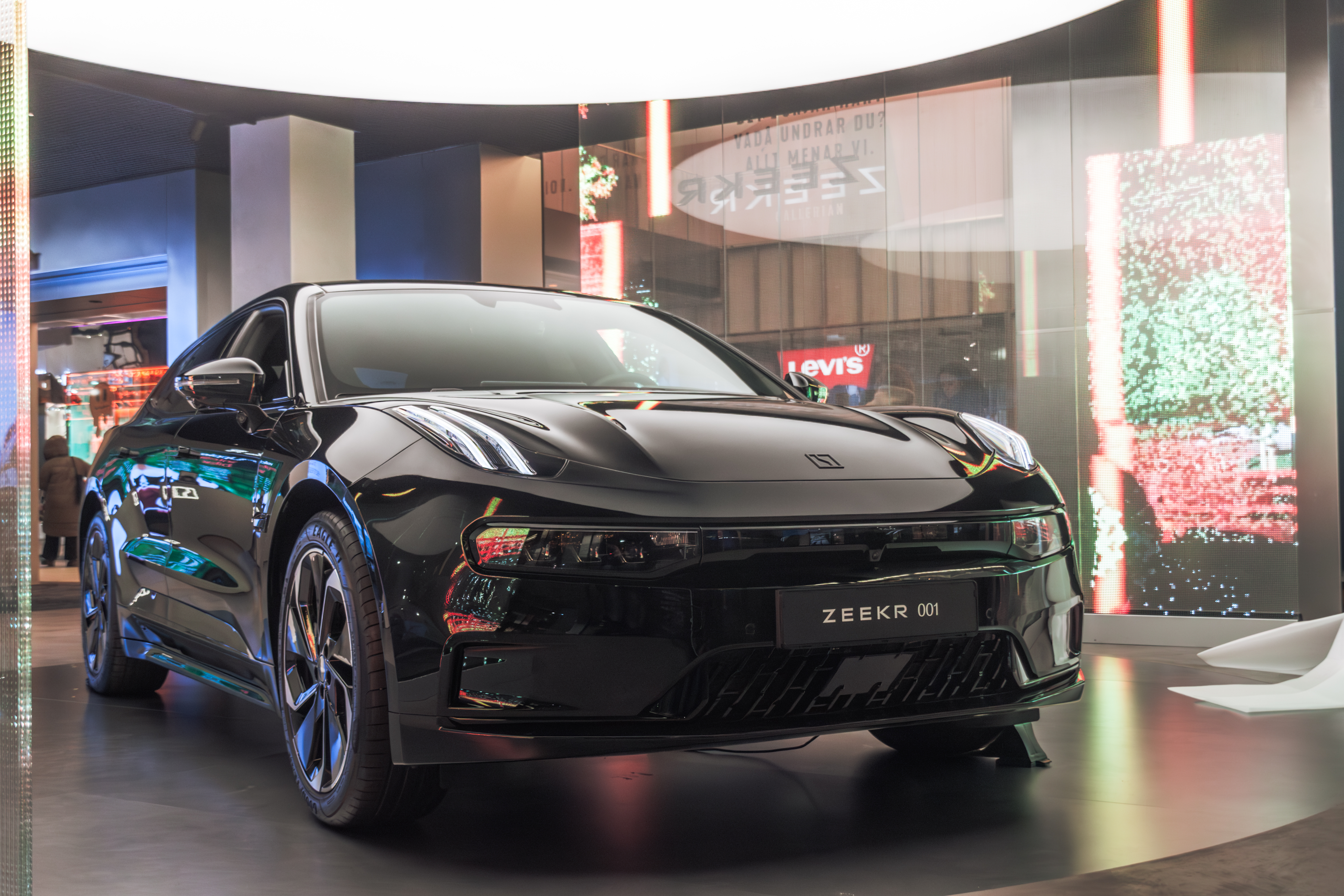
Zeekr 001 2025

In August 2024, just six months after the release of the 2024 model, Zeekr introduced the 2025 model, featuring Geely's advanced Haohan Smart Driving 2.0 system, which offers significantly improved autonomous driving capabilities. The hardware of Haohan Smart Driving 2.0 consists of 1 lidar, 12 high-definition cameras, 5 millimeter wave radars and 12 ultrasonic radars. The autonomous driving chip is upgraded from the dual EyeQ5H of Mobileye, which has only 48Tops of computing power, to dual NVIDIA OrinX, which has 508Tops of computing power.

Frequent vehicle model updates — with nearly three major improvements within a year — have led to strong protests from existing car owners following the launch of the 2025 model. In response to the backlash, the comment function was disabled during the live stream of the new model's launch event.

Some car owners escalated their protests by entering Zeekr's headquarters, demanding compensation. Zeekr rejected requests to upgrade older vehicles to the new Haohan system, citing hardware incompatibility. The company explained that the Haohan system and the older Mobileye solution differ significantly in chip architecture, system control, and wiring layout, making hardware upgrades unfeasible. However, Zeekr assured owners that the Mobileye system would continue receiving software updates.

== Safety ==
Euro NCAP test results Zeekr 001 Long Range RWD (LHD) (2024)
Test	Points	%
Overall:	5 /5 stars	
Adult occupant:	35.9	89%
Child occupant:	43.5	88%
Pedestrian:	53	84%
Safety assist:	15.1	83%

== Zeekr 001 FR ==
In September 2023, Zeekr unveiled the 001 FR (Future Road), a limited-edition performance model equipped with quad electric motors delivering a total of 1,248 hp (931 kW; 1,265 PS), 0–100 km/h (0–62 mph) in 2.02 seconds. The car features track-level brakes and suspension, carbon fiber components, and a "tank turn" mode. Built on an 800V platform, it is powered by a 100 kWh CATL Qilin battery. Zeekr announced plans to produce 99 units per month.

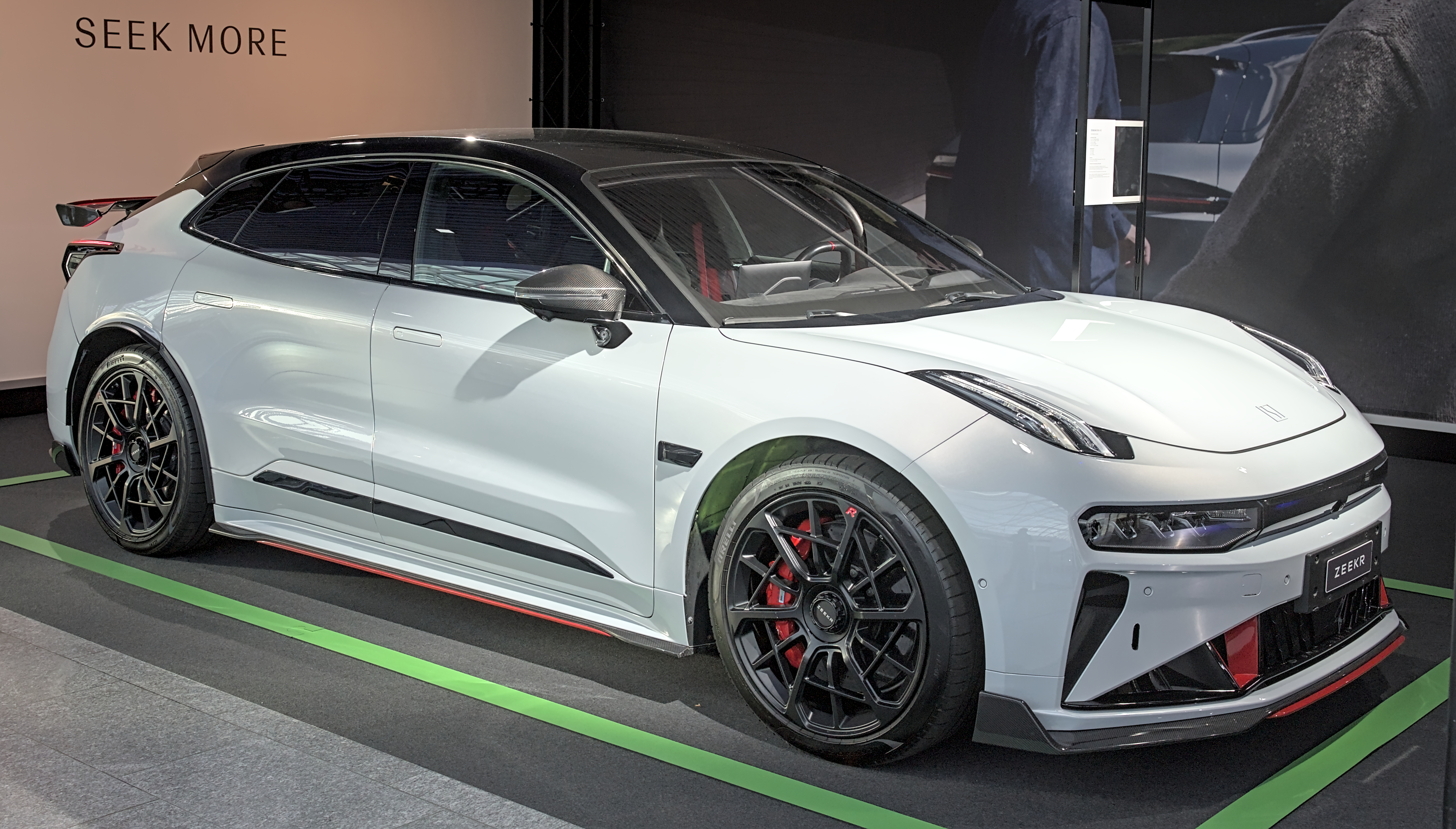
Zeekr 001 FR

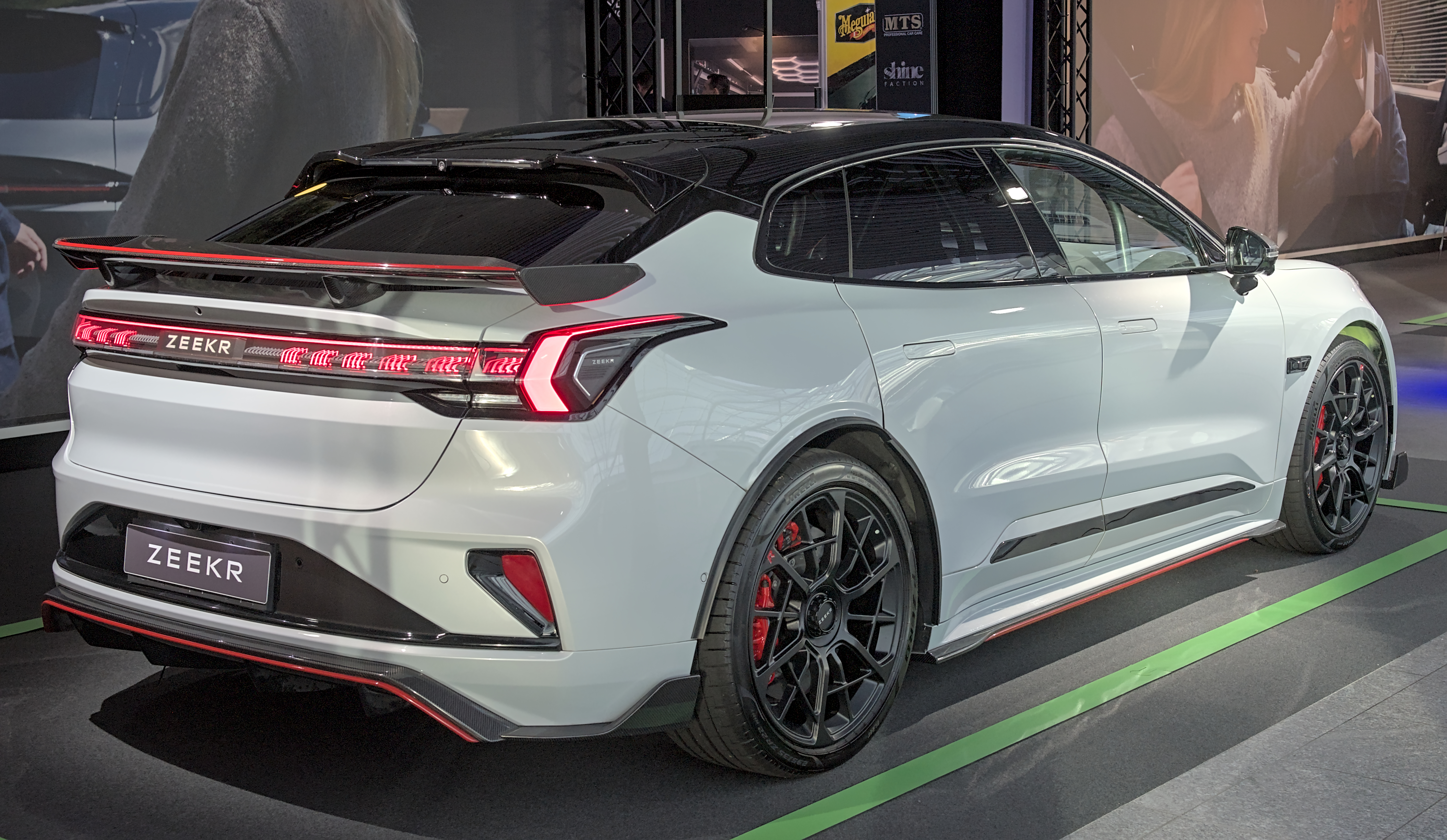
Rear view (FR)

== Sales ==
2,012 units were sold in more than 150 cities across China during the first full month of production in November 2021, with 199 additional units during October 2021. The company stated its plan to ramp up production during 2022 with a target of 70,000 vehicles, and continuing to prioritize local market customers ahead of a global roll-out in 2023.

Year	China	
Year	001	001 FR
2022	71,941	—
2023	76,246	—
2024	99,984	241
2025	40,077	11
