= Tritium (company) =

Australian charging station manufacturer

Tritium Pty Ltd
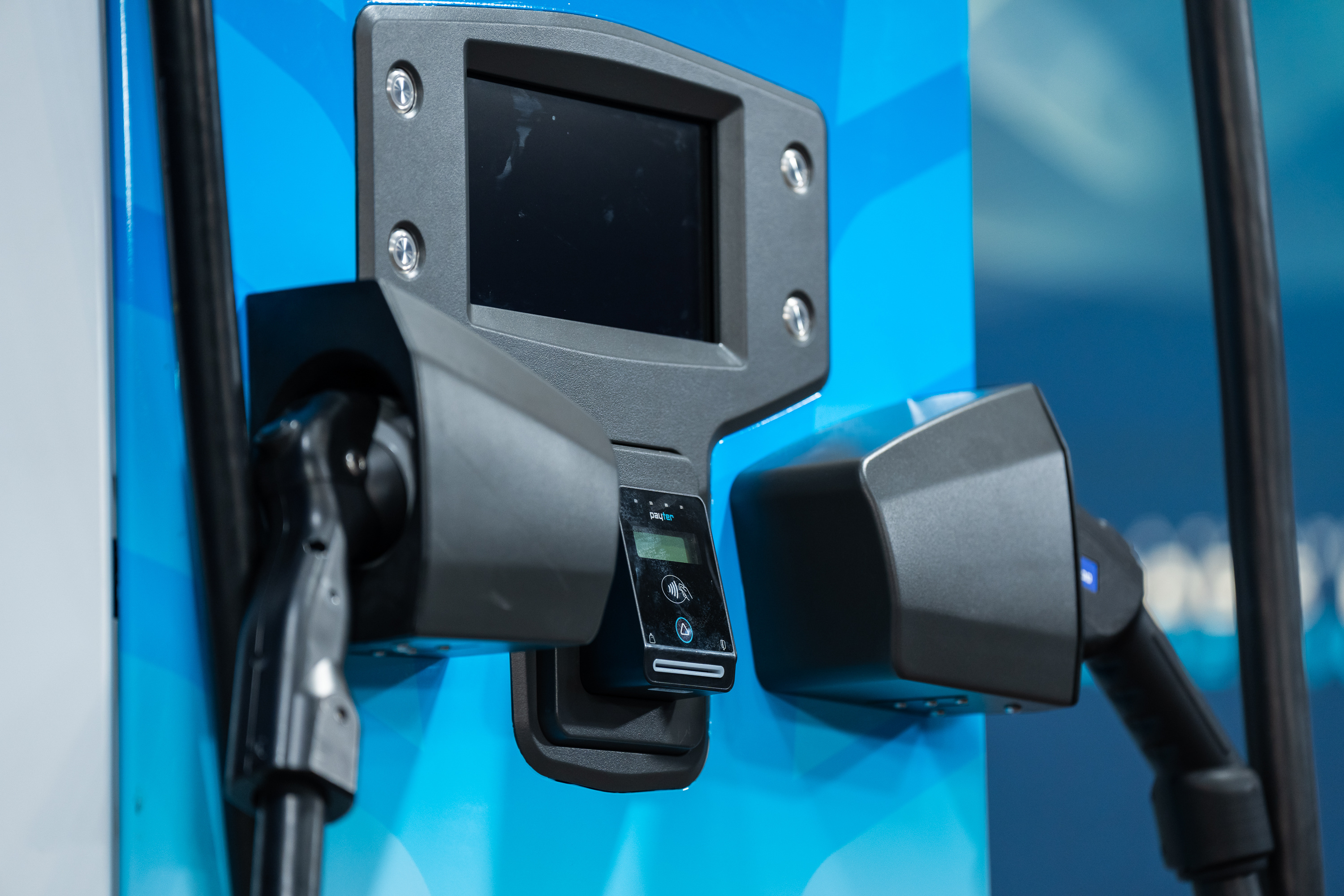
- Type: Private
- Industry: Electric vehicle charging
- Founded: 2001
- Founders: David Finn, James Kennedy, Paul Sernia
- Headquarters: Brisbane, Queensland, Australia
- Key people: Arcady Sosinov (CEO)
- Products: DC fast chargers
- Parent: Exicom Tele-Systems
- Website: tritiumcharging.com

Tritium Pty Ltd is an Australian company specialising in the design and manufacture of DC electric vehicle (EV) fast chargers. Founded in 2001 in Brisbane, Tritium gained international recognition for its innovative charging solutions and played a significant role in the global expansion of electric vehicle charging networks. Despite early success, the company faced financial challenges, leading to its acquisition in 2024.

== History ==
Tritium was established by engineers David Finn, James Kennedy, and Paul Sernia, initially focusing on developing technology for solar-powered race cars. Their work in power electronics led to the development of the Veefil RT50, Tritium's first DC fast charging product. The company rapidly expanded and deployed chargers across multiple continents.

By the early 2020s, Tritium's chargers had been deployed in over 40 countries, with a major presence in North America, Europe, and the Asia-Pacific.

In 2022, Tritium announced a U.S. manufacturing facility in Lebanon, Tennessee. The plant was designed to produce up to 30,000 DC chargers annually and employ 500 staff, supporting growth in U.S. electric vehicle adoption.

In April 2024, Tritium declared insolvency after accruing over $500 million in debt, citing fierce global competition and scaling challenges.

In August 2024, the company was acquired by Exicom Tele-Systems, an Indian electronics firm, via a Dutch subsidiary. The deal preserved over 300 jobs, including those at the Tennessee factory and Brisbane engineering centre.

In May 2025, Tritium introduced its Tri-Flex charging platform at ACT Expo. The platform is a scalable architecture designed to support growing commercial EV fleet charging demands.

== Products ==
Tritium's range of products includes:

Model	Power Output (max)	Platform/features	Availability	Links
RT50	50 kW	Standalone	No	
RTM75	75 kW	MSC (Modular design)	Yes	
RT175-S	175 kW	Standalone	No	
PKM150	150 kW	MSC (Modular design)	Yes	
PK350	350 kW	Standalone	Yes, Americans excluded	
TRI-FLEX	400+ kW	Scalable system (Modular hub-and-dispenser design)	Yes	
