= Electrify America =

Electric vehicle charging network in U.S.

Electrify America, LLC
- Type: Private
- Industry: Automotive
- Founded: September 7, 2016; 10 years ago
- Headquarters: Reston, Virginia, United States
- Number of locations: 1,080 stations (August 2026)
- Area served: United States
- Key people: Robert Barrosa (President and CEO)
- Owners: Volkswagen Group of America (82%); Siemens (18%)
- Website: electrifyamerica.com

Electrify America, LLC is an electric vehicle DC fast-charging network in the United States, with more than 1,080 stations and over 5,600 DC fast charging connectors as of August 2026. It is a subsidiary of Volkswagen Group of America, established in late 2016 by the automaker as part of its efforts to offset emissions in the wake of the Volkswagen emissions scandal. Volkswagen invested $2 billion in creating Electrify America. In June 2022, Siemens became a minority shareholder of the company. Electrify America supports the CCS and CHAdeMO connector types with plans to add NACS connectors starting in 2025. Electrify America has been the target of significant criticism for the lack of reliability and maintenance of its stations.

== History ==
In 2015, the United States Environmental Protection Agency accused Volkswagen Group of using defeat devices in its diesel-fueled vehicles in order to hide from regulators that the vehicles exceeded emissions standards. The scandal quickly grew, leading eventually to billions of dollars of penalties and agreements to buy back vehicles, among other consequences.

As part of a consent decree reached with United States officials in 2016, Volkswagen agreed to numerous actions, with US$2 billion in total, to promote electric vehicle use over 10 years to atone for the additional air pollution it caused. One aspect of the program was a pledge to establish a public electric vehicle charging network.

The Electrify America brand was unveiled in January 2017, along with its first phase of station buildout. Its first station opened in May 2018, in Chicopee, Massachusetts.

In June 2022, Electrify America received its first external investor with a $450 million investment from Siemens for a minority shareholder stake, valuing the company at $2.45 billion.

== Operations ==
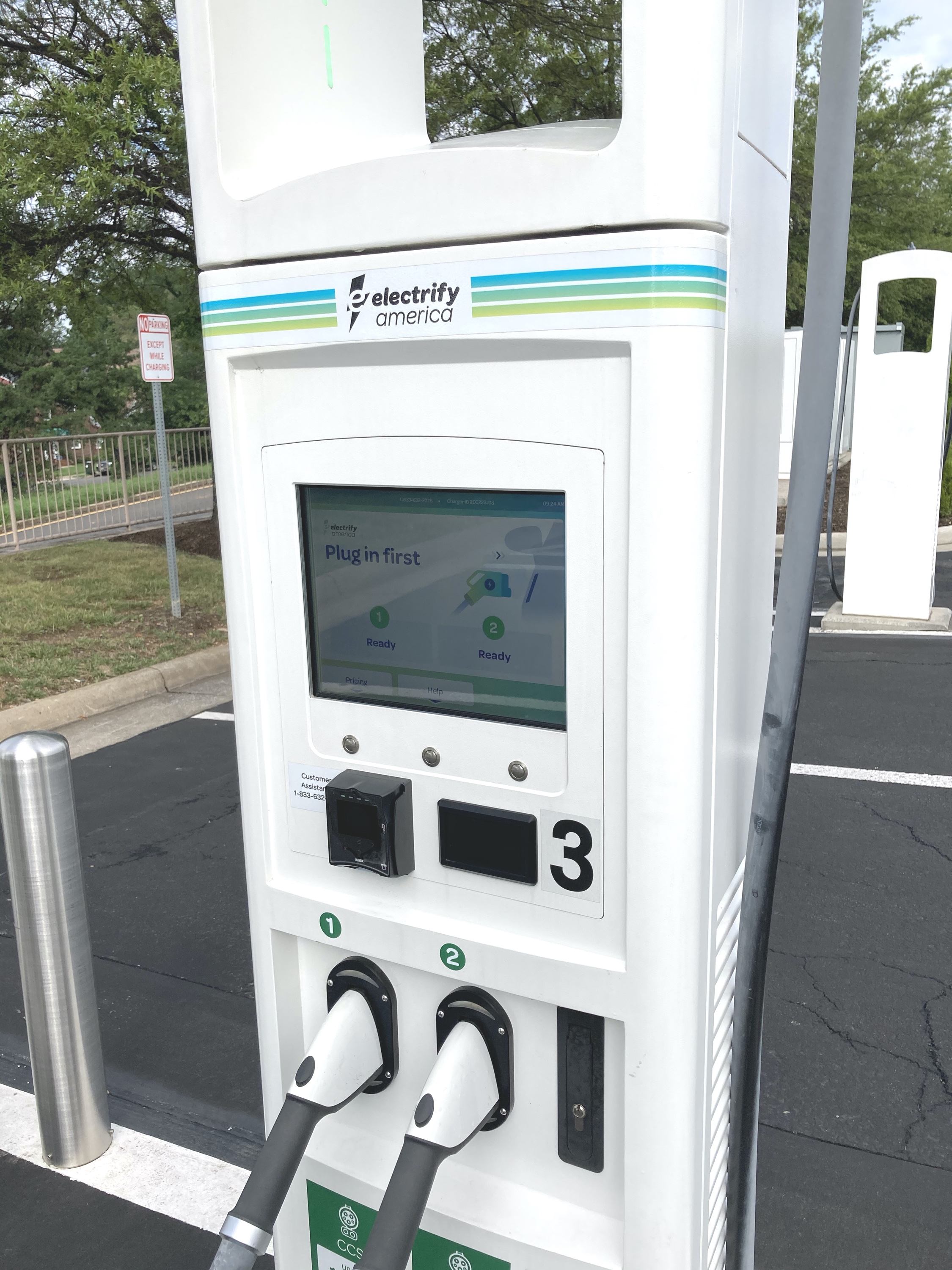
An Electrify America charging unit in Arlington, Virginia

Electrify America stations are frequently located in parking lots and parking garages of big-box stores and shopping malls. The company has location agreements with Walmart, Target and Simon Property Group, among other companies.

Electrify America stations use the Combined Charging System (CCS) and CHAdeMO connector types with plans to add North American Charging System (NACS) connectors starting in 2025. Stations are rated to provide a minimum of 50 kilowatts and up to 350 kilowatts, although the actual output is dependent on multiple factors including the vehicle's capabilities.

The network's chargers support Plug & Charge.

Electrify America prices its electricity in most states where it operates based on the energy dispensed, charged by kilowatt-hour. In some states, such as Montana and Wyoming, users are charged by the amount of time their vehicle is plugged in. This is usually because the state allows only electric utilities to charge for the amount of electricity a customer uses. Electrify America charges an idle fee when a car is done charging at select locations.

Electrify America is also building a charger network in Canada called Electrify Canada, and added a commercial section in January 2021 targeting business, utilities and government agencies. Electrify Commercial provides customized end-to-end EV charging solutions to businesses, utility companies, fleet owners, travel centers and convenience stores. In May 2023, they announced an agreement with Rocky Mountain Power to provide fast charging options across the state of Utah with Electrify Commercial providing the charging equipment, installation, and ongoing operations with maintenance. In June 2024, the first charging stations to open as part of Electrify America and Rocky Mountain Power's collaboration were in Millcreek, Utah and Vernal, Utah, followed in July 2024 by a new station in Moab, Utah.

== Criticism ==
Electrify America has been the target of significant criticism for lack of reliability and maintenance of its stations, especially in comparison to the Tesla Supercharger network. There are numerous reports of charge dispensers that remain inoperable or capable of only delivering limited power for weeks or months at a time.

Because of the lack of reliability, there is a claim that Electrify America, and all U.S. charging network providers except Tesla, have been more focused on installing new stations than funding operations and maintenance. Electrify America, with almost 4,000 chargers, faces criticism for its day-to-day performance, with reliability issues and consumer dissatisfaction. Despite efforts to improve, drivers report frustration with broken screens, faulty payment systems, and chargers providing less than maximum charging speed.

In December 2023, Electrify America announced it would spend $172 million to replace or upgrade 600 charging stalls in California in response to the network's subpar performance. The upgrade would replace stations that were installed as part of the company's first two waves of expansion in 2018. In August 2024, in their quarterly report to the California Air Resources Board, Electrify America reported upgrading 6 existing charging stations in California with 32 of their next-generation chargers in Q2 2024, along with progress on 32 proposed charging stations in California that are currently in the design, permitting, construction or energization phases.

== See also ==
- Electrify Canada
- Charging station
- Electric vehicle network
- IONITY
