= Alpitronic =

Italian electric equipment manufacturer

- Type: Ltd
- Industry: Electrical equipment
- Founded: 2009; 17 years ago
- Headquarters: Bolzano, Italy
- Area served: Worldwide
- Key people: Philipp Senoner
- Revenue: 1 billion EUR (2025)
- Number of employees: 1100 (2025)
- Website: www.alpitronic.it

Alpitronic is an electrical equipment manufacturer based in Bolzano, Italy. Founded in 2009, its rise began in 2018 with the Hypercharger product line, a type of high-power charger (HPC) for electric vehicles, which has achieved a market share of 30 % in Europe.

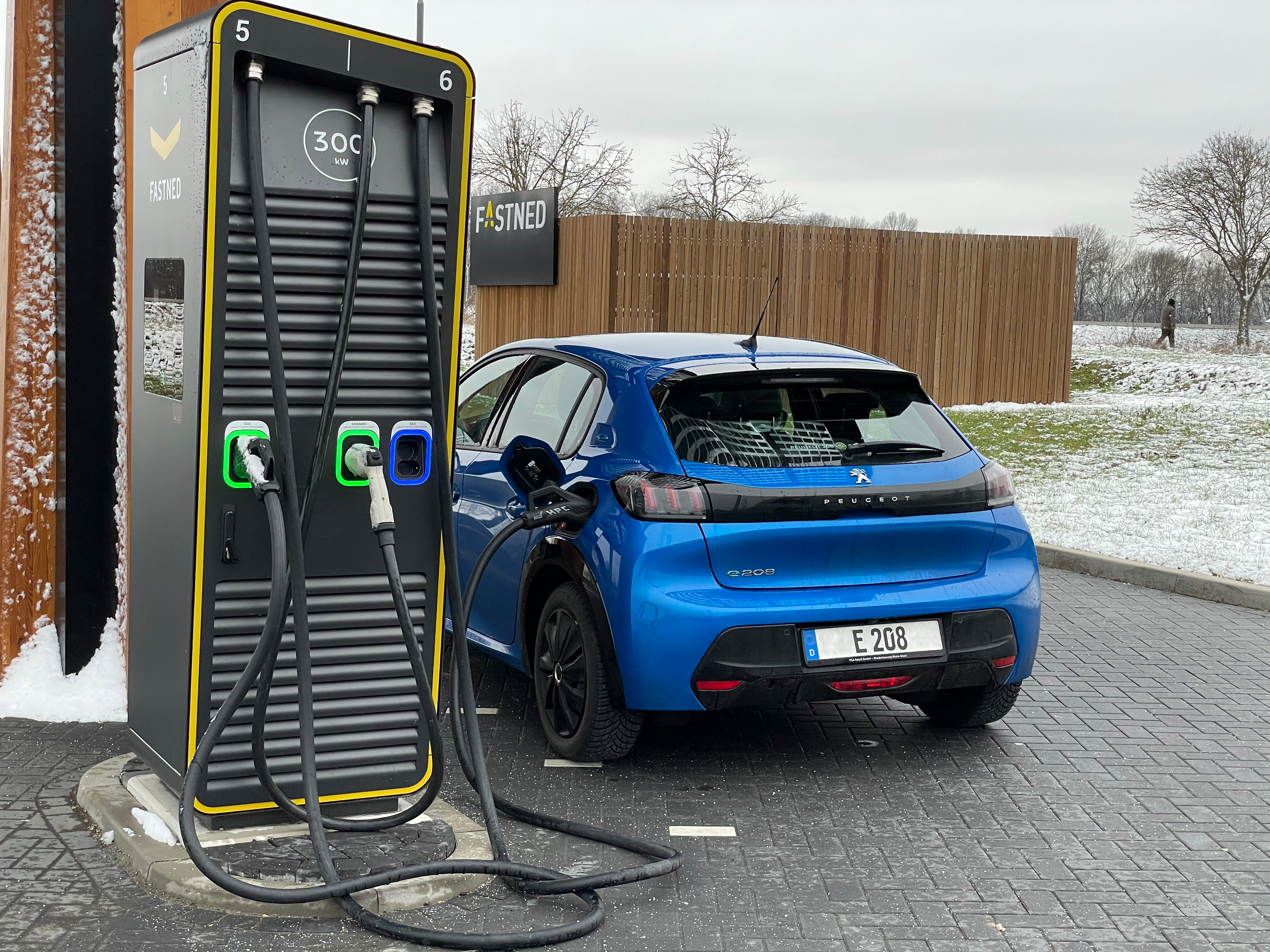
Electric car charging with CCS2 connector at 300 kW HPC charging station – HYC 300

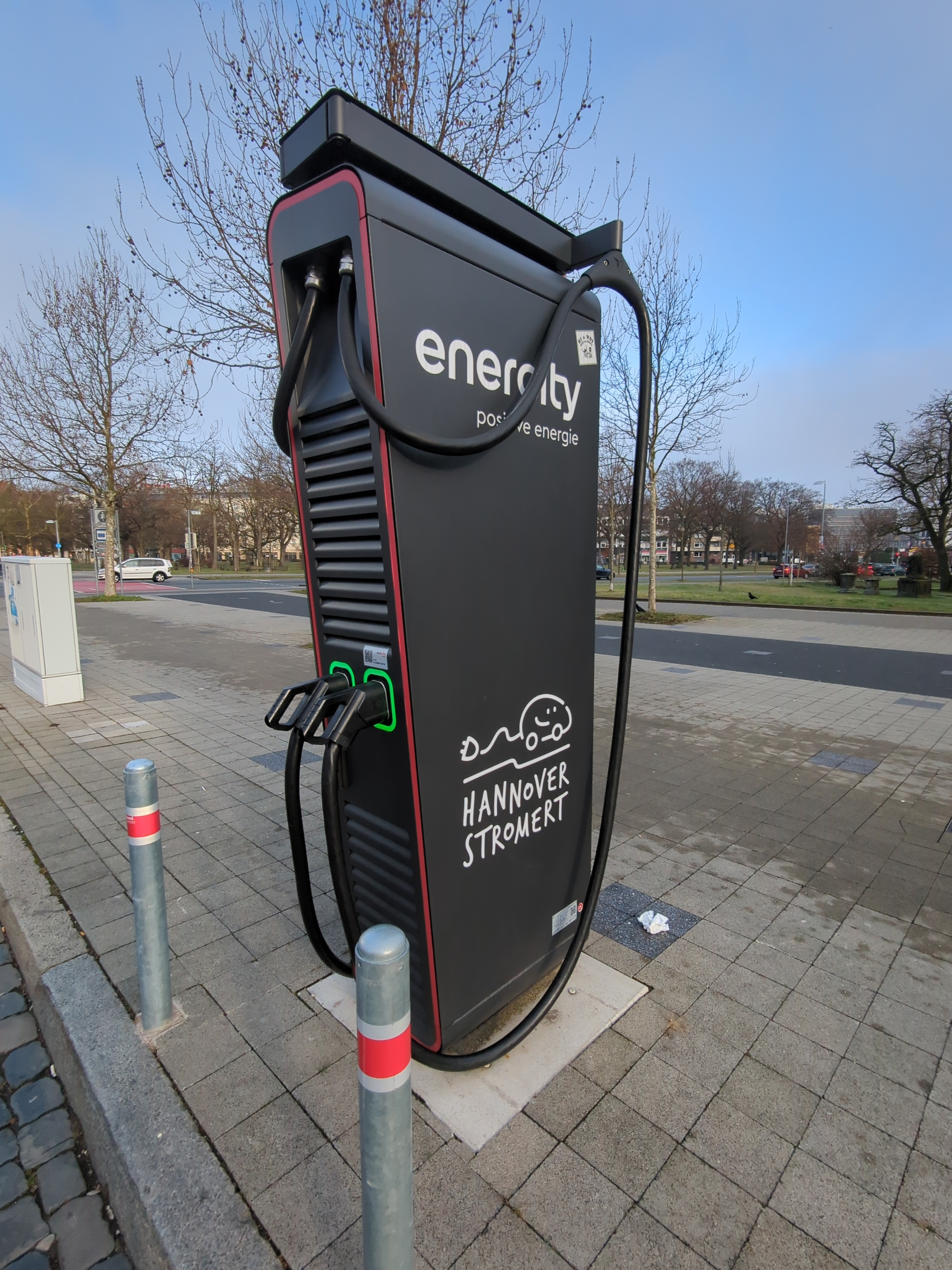
Hypercharger HYC 150 with a 5m cable

== History ==
The company was founded in 2009 as a start-up in the Techno Innovation Park TIS. Its primary focus was on power electronics. In 2015, the company moved to the Bozner Boden and began constructing a production facility. From 2016, it delivered a snow cannon control systems in small batches. In 2017, development began on a product line for DC fast-charging stations, which went into production in 2018, starting with a 50 kW version. While the company achieved a turnover of just under one billion euros in 2023, it was slightly above that figure in 2024. 2025 showed a halted market growth with a turnover of just under one billion euros. The number of employees rose to 1100 in 2025.

Overall the fast-charging network market is developing exponentially. The company manufactured 80 devices in 2018, 900 in 2019, and 20.000 fast-chargers in 2023. Overall 135.000 Alpitronic charge points have been in operation in 2025. The first megawatt charger by Alpitronic opened in May 2025 on the Brenner motorway.

== Hypercharger ==
The next generation with 300 kW was then built with a modular concept for different power classes. The Alpitronic Hypercharger HYC 300 were first delivered in May 2018 allowing for a maximum of four power-modules, each with 75 kW, and their power can be distributed across two charging cables.

The new model HYC 400 had been presentend in May 2022. It can provide a maximum charging power of 400 kW in 50 kW increments, allowing for two vehicles to be charged at 200 kW. It took about one year to the first deliveries in April 2023. The silicon carbide-based charging stations from Alpitronic have a market share of over 50 % in some markets, and a market share of 30% across Europe in 2024.

The Hypercharger models HYC 150 and HYC 200 models are narrower and allow a maximum of two inverter modules, but they are otherwise technically identical to their sibling models, the Hypercharger models HYC 300 and HYC 400. All models can be ordered with either 3.5 or 5 m cable system.

In 2025, the HYC 1000 charging system was introduced, in which the power modules are no longer installed in the charging station but in an inverter station (power cabinet) that serves up to eight charging stations. For the Megawatt Charging System it provides 1000 kW, and for the Combined Charging System up to 600 kW (max 600 A at max 1000 V). The charging stations are prepared for a 1500 A MCS connection; with two oil-cooled connections, both can be loaded simultaneously with 600 A.

In March 2026, the second generation of the Hypercharger HYC 400 was announced. They can be distinguished from the previous model by having the display located on the front. Technically, the maximum charging power remains at 400 kW in 50 kW increments; however 600 A can now be provided continuously, not just briefly in boost mode. This limitation results from the same maximum of the four silicon carbide modules, each providing a capacity of 100 kW. The second generation of these modules differs only slightly in terms of performance data, while the charging station's standby power consumption has been reduced by 100 W to 43 W.

The Hypercharger is used by MFG "EV Power" sites in the UK.
