= BP Pulse =

BP electric vehicle charging infrastructure subsidiary

Chargemaster Limited
- Type: Subsidiary
- Industry: Electric vehicles
- Founded: 2008
- Headquarters: Linford Wood, Milton Keynes, England
- Key people: David Martell (CEO)
- Products: Electric vehicle charging infrastructure
- Number of employees: 200 (2017)
- Parent: BP
- Website: www.bppulse.com

Chargemaster Limited (branded as bp pulse, formerly BP Chargemaster, chargemaster, POLAR and Polar Plus) is a supplier of charging infrastructure for electric vehicles, based in Milton Keynes, England. It provides charging units for home, business and public use, and operates its own electric vehicle fast charging network.

Chargemaster was the first company to manufacture electric vehicle rapid chargers in the UK. As of 2017, the company had supplied more than 30,000 charging points for electric vehicle drivers' homes and more than 10,000 public and commercially operated charging points.

The company was founded in 2008 by entrepreneur David Martell. In June 2018, BP announced that it had entered into an agreement to buy Chargemaster for £130m, with the company to be rebranded BP Chargemaster. Further rebranding to 'bp pulse' took place in December 2020.

== History ==
Tritium charging unit, Moonah, Tasmania

Chargemaster was founded in Luton in 2008 by David Martell, the founder and former CEO of Trafficmaster. Shareholders included the venture capital arm of BMW, BMW i Ventures, and technology company Qualcomm.

The company launched its POLAR network of public charging points in 2011. By 2017, the network had over 5,000 public charging points, just under 40% of the total of more than 13,000 charging points in the UK.

In 2012, Chargemaster announced its involvement in a trial of wireless charging for electric vehicles in London, in partnership with Qualcomm. Growth capital, initially £3 million, was invested by Beringea in 2014.

Chargemaster launched its POLAR Plus subscription scheme in 2015, allowing members to pay a monthly fee for access to its public charging network, with points earned each time a member uses a public charging point, which could be traded for a week-long experience in one of a fleet of electric vehicles operated by Chargemaster, including a BMW i8 and a Tesla Model S.

Chargers in Ruddington, UK

Chargemaster acquired Hereford-based GB Electrical, a national electrical contractor specialising in the installation of electric vehicle charging points, in 2015. The business had been working with Chargemaster since 2013 and is an authorised installer of charging points installed under both the Electric Vehicle Homecharge Scheme and the Workplace Charging Scheme, administered by the Office for Low Emission Vehicles. Following the acquisition, Chargemaster announced a £15 million investment in its charging network to create 2,000 new charging points, which would include new ways to access the points, including contactless payments, alongside existing access methods of RFID cards and smartphone apps.

In 2017, the company acquired the electric vehicle charging point supplier Elektromotive, including its charging network management subsidiary, Charge Your Car, to form the UK's largest electric vehicle infrastructure provider.

After being acquired by BP in 2018, the company's legal name changed from Chargemaster plc to Chargemaster Limited. Martell retained a board position until June 2019. Later that year, the company moved from Luton to newly built headquarters in the Linford Wood area of Milton Keynes. In December 2020, the POLAR and Chargemaster brands were replaced by 'bp pulse'.

Chargemaster has been listed in the Sunday Times Tech Track 100 list of top performing British companies since 2014.

== Products ==
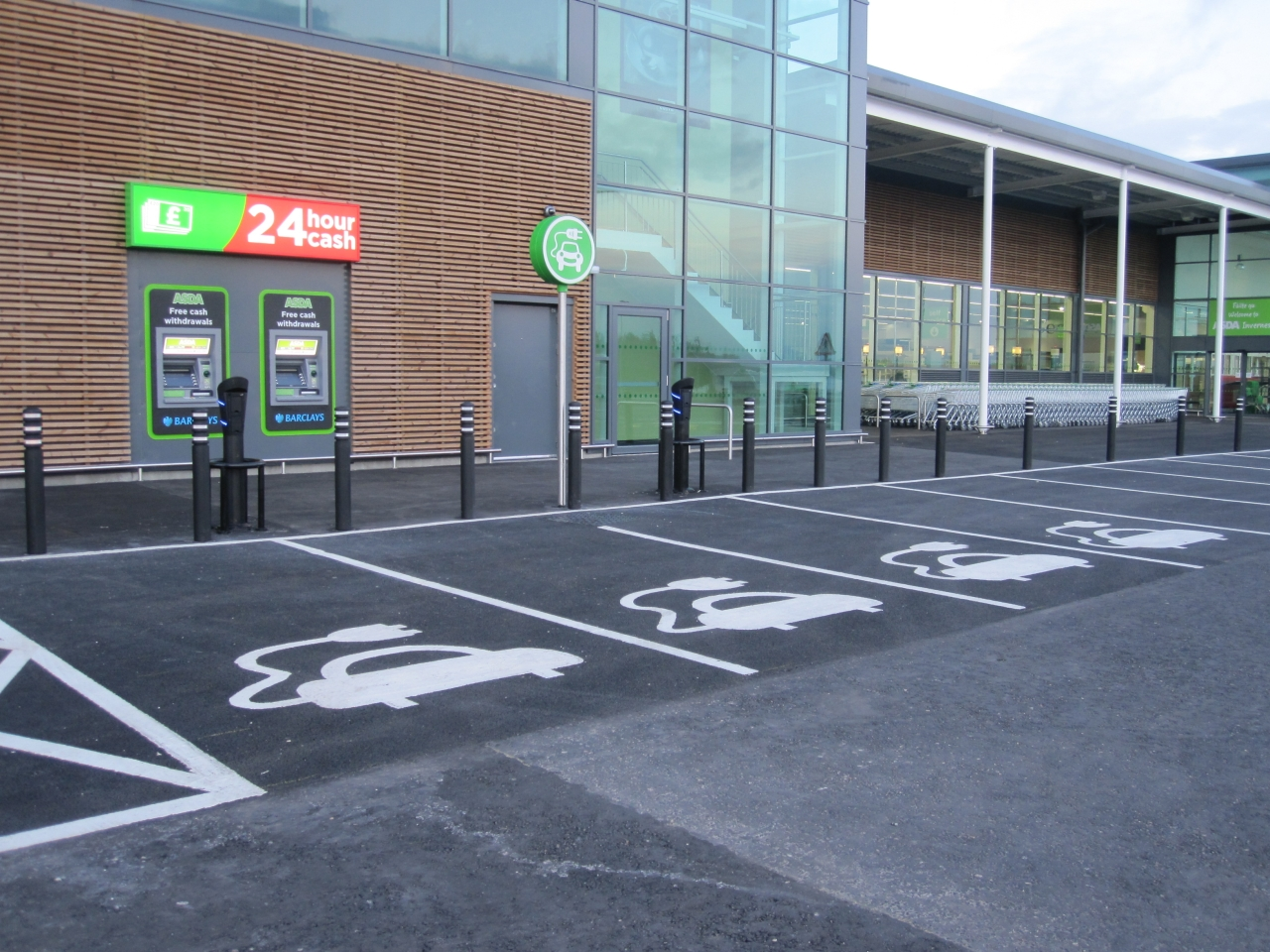
Chargemaster charging points at an Asda store in Inverness

=== Charging units ===
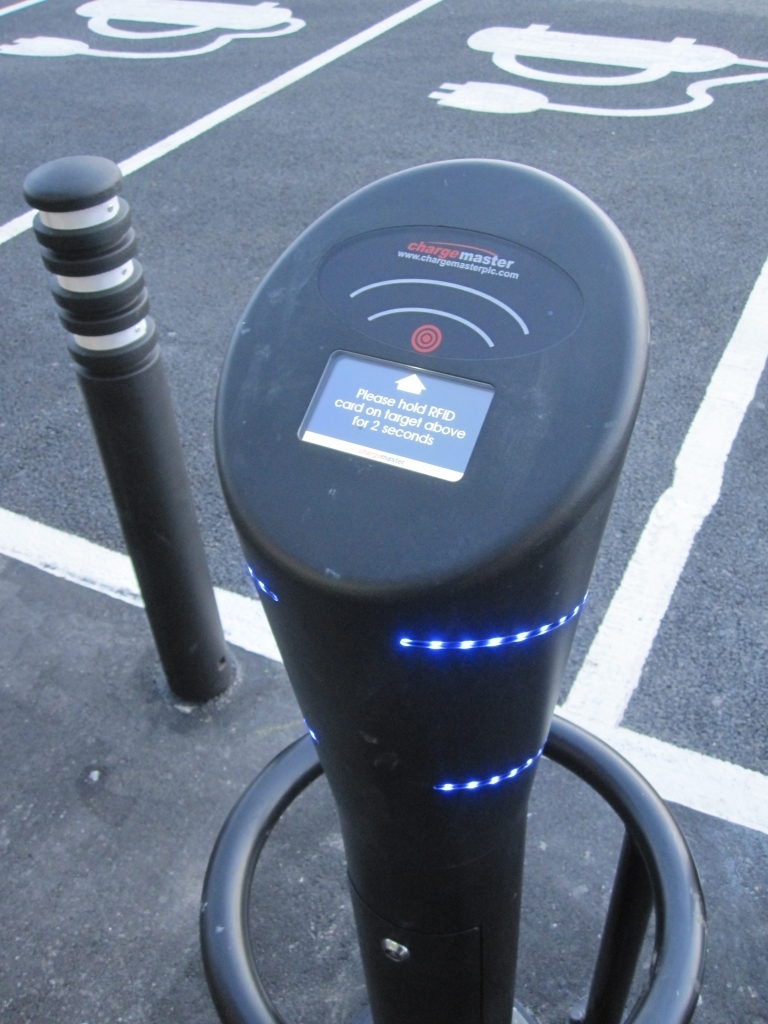
A Chargemaster charging point

Chargemaster supplies wall-mounted charging points and floor-standing charging posts with AC power ratings of 3.6 kW, 7.2 kW and 22 kW, and floor-standing rapid chargers, with power ratings of 43kW AC and 50kW DC. The 3.6 kW and 7.2 kW charging units require a minimum single-phase electricity supply. The 22 kW and rapid charging units require a three-phase electricity supply.

Chargemaster launched a new rapid charger in 2015, which is produced in its Milton Keynes factory. The Chargemaster 'Ultracharge' unit features a 50 kW-rated chademo connector, a 43kW-rated AC Type 2 connector and a 50 kW-rated CCS connector.

Chargemaster installed their first 150 kW rapid charger in 2019; these chargers are supplied by ABB and feature both CHAdeMO and CCS connectors. Chargemaster aims to have 400 of these chargers at BP forecourts.

=== Home charging ===
==== Withdrawal of support for Home Charging product ====
As of 5 November 2005 the bp pulse app and cloud services for home charging ceased to be available.

Existing units continue to function, but NOT as a Smart Charger.

Scheduling is no longer possible via a BP app or web portal but MAY be possible via vehicle functionality.

==== Archived Home Charging product information ====
Chargemaster had partnerships to provide home charging units for owners of electric vehicles made by several manufacturers, including BMW, Kia, Mercedes-Benz, Mitsubishi, Nissan, Renault, and Toyota.

The company was the home charging partner for The London Taxi Company and provided charging units for drivers of its TX eCity plug-in hybrid taxi.

=== Workplace charging ===
==== Withdrawal from workplace charging market ====
Focus on charging on the go appears to be the stated aim of BP to maximise the value proposition.

==== Archived workplace information ====
Chargemaster supplied charge points to workplaces, including supermarkets, local authorities and other businesses.

==== Potential future options for Fleets ====
Backlash by Fleet Managers gives BP reasons to seek partnership.

=== Public sector charging ===
Chargemaster has installed over 600 charge points for more than 50 local authorities.

In 2016, Chargemaster was awarded a £2.3 million contract to provide additional charging points in Milton Keynes, including for two new petrol-station-style rapid charging hubs.

In 2017, Chargemaster was awarded a contract to supply its Ultracharge rapid charger under a transport for london contract to provide public rapid charging points for The London Taxi Company's forthcoming TX eCity plug-in hybrid taxi. The £18 million Transport for London project aimed to create a network of 300 rapid charging points in London by 2020.

== Brands ==
=== Pulse public charging network ===
The company operates 'bp pulse', one of the largest electric vehicle charging networks in the UK. As of 2024, the network has over 8,000 charge points of which over 3,000 are described as "high speed". The network is accessible via either a pay-as-you-go 'instant access' scheme or a monthly subscription scheme, with charging points accessed via an RFID card or fob. Prior to December 2020, the schemes were marketed as 'POLAR Instant' and 'POLAR Plus' respectively.

Owners of BMW i models can access the network through membership of the BMW i ChargeNow service.

=== Charge Your Car ===
The Charge Your Car subsidiary provides "back office" services to charge point owners, in many cases local authorities. CYC handles user registration and billing, and provides a map of charge points, but does not own or maintain the equipment.

== Electric Vehicle Experience Centre ==
In 2017, Chargemaster won the contract from Milton Keynes Council to operate the UK's first multi-brand electric car showroom, the Electric Vehicle Experience Centre, as part of the UK government’s Go Ultra Low Cities programme.

== Partnerships ==
BP Pulse/Iberdrola joint venture vehicle charging point in Andalusia, Spain

Chargemaster has partnerships with hotels, supermarkets and motor industry organisations, including: The AA, Q Park, Waitrose, and Accor for its Novotel and Ibis hotel brands.

Chargemaster installed 78 charge points for the London Fire Brigade, the majority of which are accessible by its staff, but nine of which (at Croydon, East Ham, Edmonton, Finchley, Hainault, Harold Hill, Hornsey, Ilford and New Malden fire stations) are publicly accessible.

The company is the official supplier of charging infrastructure to the FIA Formula E electric motor racing series. Chargemaster facilitates wireless charging of the official course cars, including the BMW i8 safety car and the BMW i3 medical car.
