= ChargePlace Scotland =

Electric vehicles in Scotland

ChargePlace Scotland, also referred to as CPS, is a Scottish Government funded initiative to develop, own and operate critical infrastructure for sustainable energy delivery to electric vehicle drivers. It is Scotland's national electric vehicle (EV) charging network, developed to support the country's transition to sustainable transport and achieve net-zero carbon emissions by 2045. Established by the Scottish Government, CPS is one of the most comprehensive charging networks in the United Kingdom, with a mix of rapid, fast, and standard chargers distributed across urban, rural, and remote areas across Scotland. The network is publicly funded and designed to ensure widespread accessibility, contributing significantly to Scotland's climate goals.

== Activities ==
ChargePlace Scotland has 2,923 publicly available charge points registered in the ChargePlace Scotland Network. The network covers major transport routes and ensures accessibility even in Scotland's most remote regions, addressing a critical need for equitable EV charging availability. The network is primarily composed of charge points owned by local authorities and private businesses but is managed centrally by SWARCO, a business from Swarovski.

ChargePlace Scotland has no planned investment beyond 1 April 2025 due to a decision to transition away from the network. "The current ChargePlace Scotland contract has the option to run until mid-2025", and Transport Scotland has stated that they will continue to evaluate the future of the network beyond this period.

In June 2022, ChargePlace Scotland partnered with Paua Tech Limited, as the first roaming partnership for the network, to enable seamless roaming across their EV charging network for business drivers in a single payment solution.

ChargePlace Scotland was initially free but has introduced costs to the network since 2024.

== History ==
ChargePlace Scotland (CPS) was launched in 2013 by Transport Scotland with an initial network of 55 public charge points, aiming to reduce greenhouse gas emissions and support early electric vehicle (EV) adopters. Over time, it has grown into a nationwide network, funded through public grants and contributions from local authorities and other organizations.

In 2021, the contract to operate ChargePlace Scotland transitioned from BP Chargemaster to SWARCO eVolt following a competitive tendering process. Swarco eVolt faced criticism for technical and operational challenges during the changeover. "Massive problems at a Dundee service centre have wreaked havoc on Scotland’s £45m electric vehicle (EV) charging network." This change aimed to improve service reliability and expand the network. SWARCO implemented significant upgrades, including a redesigned mobile app, elimination of annual membership fees, and enhanced customer support.

In May 2023 rumours circulated around the closure of the ChargePlace Scotland network. This was rejected by ChargePlace Scotland. Later in 2025 the transition away from a central provider started. A full transition hub was presented in 2026 showing how parts of the network were moving to other operators.
