= Paua Tech Limited =

Paua Tech Limited, "Paua", is a British technology company providing a unified platform for electric vehicle charging and payment. This allows business drivers to use a single EV charge card (RFID), a mobile app and a web portal to manage their charging.

They provide an electric vehicle charging network aggregating UK charge point operators. They provide services at home and at work.

Paua started in April 2022 with a network of 10,000 aggregated EV charge points and all electricity provided to customers is renewable energy. As at May 2026 they stated that they provide access to 79,000 connectors

== Activities ==
The aggregation of charge point networks into a single mobile application and EV Charge card is an electric vehicle solution similar to traditional fuel cards. The company services business customers and provides a white label solution for customers such as cinch, part of the Constellation Automotive Group, in the form of cinchCharge. In 2022 Paua partnered with Moove to enable "Moove Charge" a white label application for private licence hire electric vehicle drivers. Paua partnered with Motability Operations in 2024 to launch "Go Charge" a service for Motability Scheme customers.

Paua is the largest roaming network in the UK claiming 43,000 connectors at February 2024. Charging network partners include IONITY, GRIDSERVE, Osprey, Fastned, Applegreen electric, Instavolt and others. Paua is the first and only company to have integrated the Scottish network, ChargePlace Scotland.

The Electric Vehicle Rally run by Greenfleet used the Paua EV charge card in 2022, 2023 and 2024 to support drivers travelling the length of Great Britain.

Paua has worked on a number of UK Government funded initiatives including a solution to share private electric vehicle charging depots with other drivers. Following integration with DAF Truck partners, Motus and Ford & Slater, this adds a further 16 sites to the shared depot network. The addition of the Fleete truck charging site at Tilbury makes Paua the "UK's largest aggregated truck charging network".

== Awards and recognition ==
Paua won Start-up of the Year at the Electric Vehicle Innovation and Excellence awards (EVIES) 2023.

Co-founder, Niall Riddell, won "Special Recognition - Person" in 2024 at the Electric Vehicle Innovation and Excellence awards (EVIES) with the quote "Niall genuinely cares about the world we live in and what kind of legacy we leave for future generations. He leads with kindness and compassion. He truly deserves this recognition".

Paua won the Greenfleet Award for Industry Innovation in 2025 for their shared depot charging solution.
