= Q-Park =

Parking management company based in the Netherlands

- Type: Naamloze vennootschap
- Industry: Parking
- Founded: 1998
- Headquarters: Maastricht, Netherlands
- Area served: Netherlands, Ireland, Germany, Denmark, Belgium, United Kingdom, France,
- Key people: F.K. De Moor (CEO), Marcello Lacano (CFO), Theo Thuis (COO), Karla Peijs
- Products: Parking
- Revenue: ▲€809.1 million (2015)
- Operating income: ▲€345.1 million (2012)
- Net income: ▼€-93.8 million (2012)
- Number of employees: ▼2180 (2015)
- Website: www.q-park.com

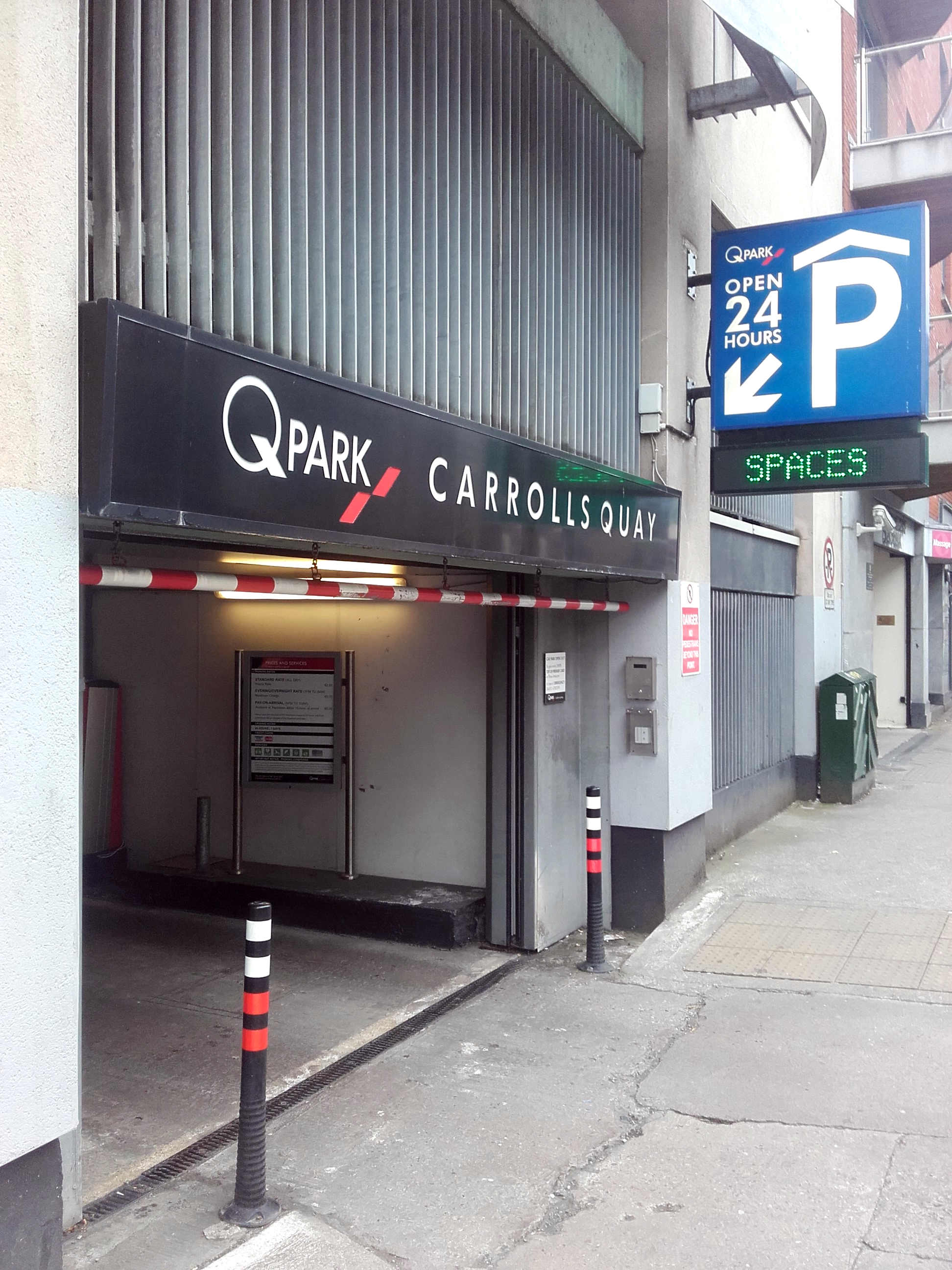
Q Park entrance Carroll's Quay Cork City

Q-Park is an operator of parking garages in Belgium, Denmark, Germany, France, Ireland, the Netherlands, and the United Kingdom. Q-Park is the number two on the European parking market. In total Q-Park controls 800,000 parking spaces on more than 3,500 locations. The company is based in Maastricht.

In the Netherlands Q-Park is the largest private exploitant of parking spaces and controls more than 220 public parking lots and 76 park and rides near railway stations. In June 2008 Q-park bought the French company Epolia for 700 million euro.
