= Plug-in electric vehicles in Japan =

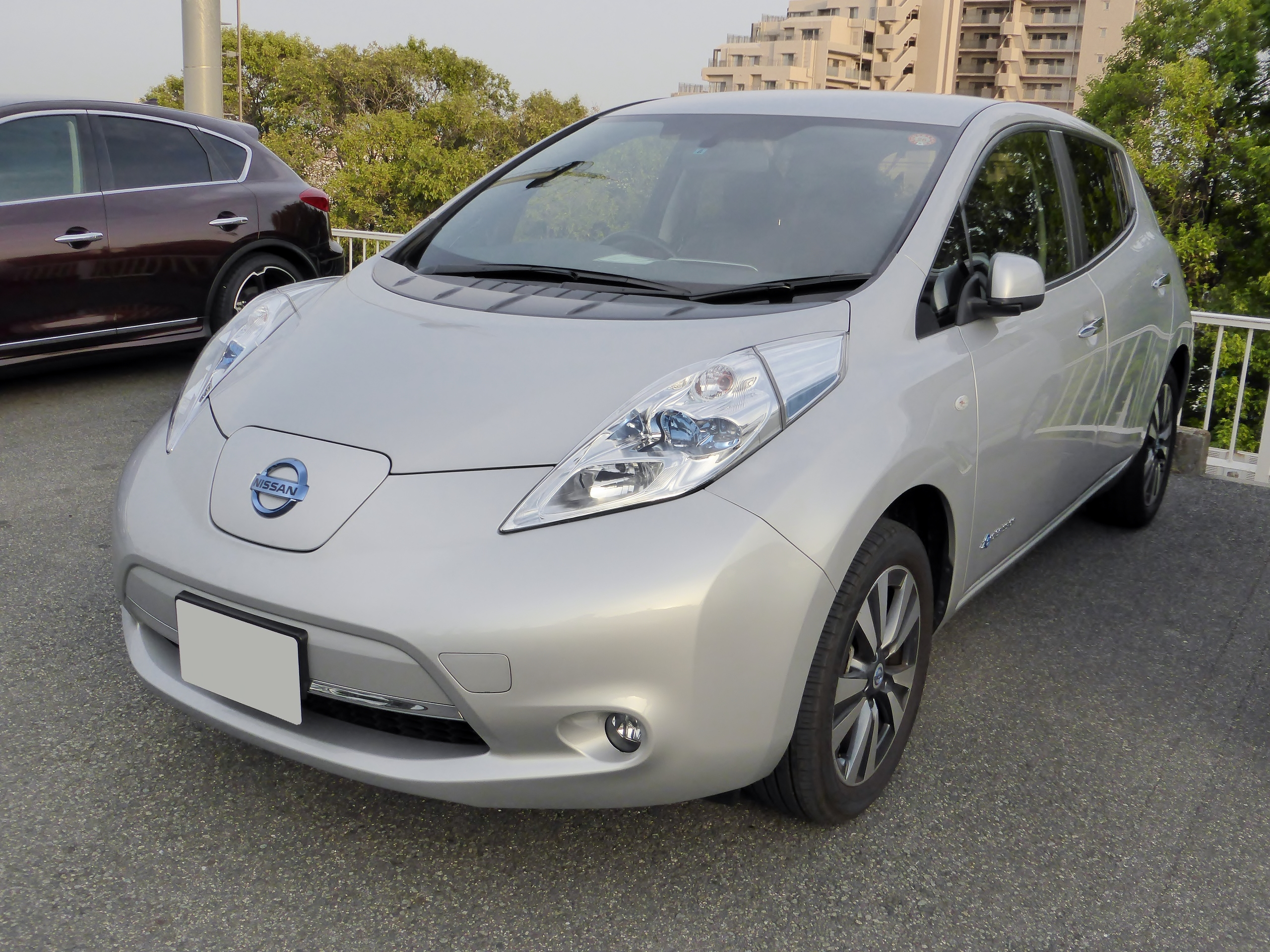
As of April 2018, the Nissan Leaf is the all-time top selling plug-in electric car in Japan, with 100,000 units sold since inception.

The fleet of light-duty plug-in electric vehicles in Japan totaled just over 300,000 highway legal plug-in electric vehicles in circulation at the end of 2020, consisting of 156,381 all-electric passenger cars, 136,700 plug-in hybrids, and 9,904 light-commercial vehicles.

The rate of growth of the Japanese plug-in segment slowed from 2013, with annual sales falling behind Europe, the U.S. and China since then. The segment market share fell from 0.68% in 2014 to 0.59% in 2016. Then the market share increased to 1.2% in 2017, and fell to 1.1% in 2018. Norway surpassed Japan as the country with the third largest plug-in car stock in use in 2019. The market share fell further to 0.7% in 2019 and 0.6% in 2020. The decline in plug-in car sales reflects the Japanese government and the major domestic carmakers decision to adopt and promote hydrogen fuel cell vehicles instead of plug-in electric vehicles, although the first commercially produced hydrogen fuel cell automobiles began in 2015.

As of April 2018, the Nissan Leaf all-electric car ranked as the all-time top selling plug-in electric vehicle in the country, with over 100,000 units sold since December 2010. Ranking second is the Mitsubishi Outlander P-HEV with 34,830 units delivered through August 2016, followed by the Toyota Prius PHV with 22,100 units sold through April 2016.

As of December 2012, Japan was the country with the highest ratio of quick charging points to electric vehicles (EVSE/EV), with a ratio of 0.030 as of December 2012. The country's charging infrastructure included 1,381 public quick-charge stations and around 300 non-domestic slow charger points. The Japanese government had set up a target to deploy 2 million slow chargers and 5,000 fast charging points by 2020.

== Introduction and sales ==
Cumulative light-duty plug-in electric vehicle sales in Japan compared to the world's top-selling countries and regional markets as of December 2021

Cumulative light-duty plug-in electric vehicle sales in Japan totaled about 151,250 units between July 2009 and December 2016, consisting of 86,390 all-electric cars (57.1%) and 64,860 plug-in hybrids (42.9%). At the end of 2016, Japan ranked as the world's third largest light-duty plug-in vehicle country market after the China and the U.S. As of September 2016, total Japanese sales of light-duty plug-in vehicles represent 8.1% of the global stock of plug-ins. The plug-in segment sales climbed from 1,080 units in 2009 to 12,630 in 2011, and reached 24,440 in 2012. Only all-electric cars were sold in the country between 2009 and 2011. Global sales of pure electric cars in 2012 were led by Japan with a 28% market share of the segment sales. Japan ranked second after the U.S. in terms of its share of plug-in hybrid sales in 2012, with 12% of global sales.

About 30,600 highway-capable plug-in electric vehicles were sold in the country in 2013, representing a 0.58% market share of the 5.3 million new automobiles and kei cars sold in 2013. In 2014 the segment sales remained flat with over 30,000 plug-in electric vehicles were sold, with the plug-in market share achieving a record market share of 1.06% of new car sales (kei cars not included). Accounting for kei cars, the plug-in segment market share falls to 0.7%. During 2014, cumulative plug-in sales in the Japanese market passed the 100,000 unit mark. However, as a result of the slow growth from 2013, Japan was surpassed in 2014 by China, with over 50,000 units sold, as the second largest world market that year. Sales totaled 24,660 units in 2015 and 24,851 units in 2016. The segment market share declined from 0.68% in 2014 to 0.59% in 2016. As a result of the slow down in sales that occurred after 2013, annual sales fell behind Europe, the U.S. and China during 2014 and 2015.

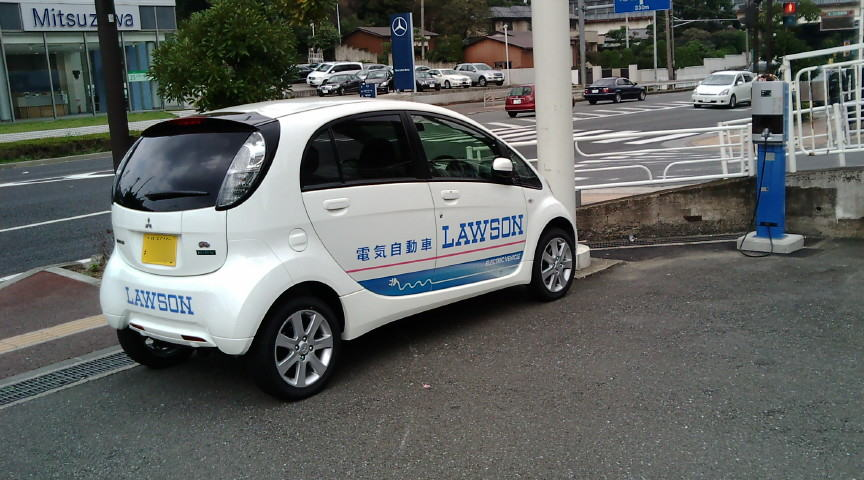
Mitsubishi i-MiEV recharging from an on-street charging station in Japan

The first electric car available in the Japanese market was the Mitsubishi i MiEV, launched for fleet customers in Japan in late July 2009. Retail sales to the public began in April 2010. Cumulative sales since July 2009 reached 11,144 i-MiEVs through April 2016. Sales of the Mitsubishi Minicab MiEV electric van began in December 2011, and a total of 6,172 units have been sold through April 2016. A truck version of the Minicab MiEV was launched in January 2013, with sales of 927 units through April 2016. Mitsubishi also launched in January 2013 a plug-in hybrid version of the Outlander, called the Mitsubishi Outlander P-HEV, becoming the first SUV plug-in hybrid in the world's market. The SUV has an all-electric range of 60 km (37 mi). The Outlander P-HEV sold 9,608 units during 2013, ranking as the second top selling plug-in electric car in Japan after the Nissan Leaf. As of April 2016, Mitsubishi Motors had sold 52,234 plug-in electric vehicles in Japan since July 2009.

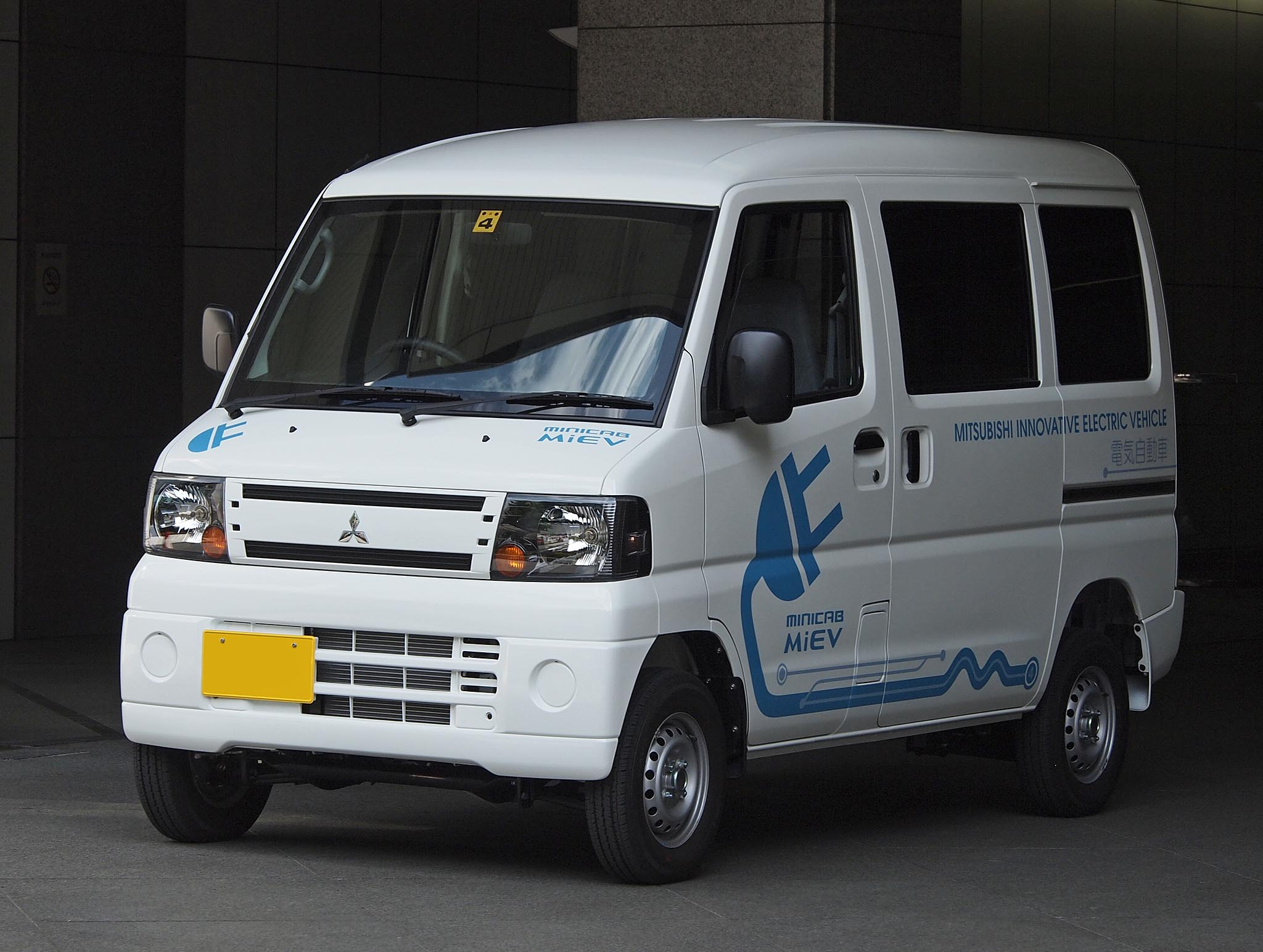
Mitsubishi Minicab MiEV in Japan

The first prototype battery switch station from Better Place was demonstrated in Yokohama on May 14, 2009. In April 2010, a 90-day switchable-battery electric taxi demonstration project was launched in Tokyo, using three Nissan Rogue crossover utility vehicles, converted into electric cars with switchable batteries provided by A123 Systems. The battery switch station deployed in Tokyo is more advanced than the Yokohama switch system demonstrated in 2009. During the three-month field test the EV taxis accumulated over 25,000 miles (40,000 km) and swapped batteries 2,122 times, with an average battery swap time of 59.1 seconds. Nissan decided to continue the trial until late November 2010.

Sales of the Nissan Leaf began on December 22, 2010, when the first 10 Leaf were delivered at the Kanagawa Prefecture. The Prefecture Government decided to assign six Leafs for official use and the other four were made available for the car rental service run by the local government. Sales of the Toyota Prius Plug-in Hybrid began in January 2012, and a total of 19,100 units have been sold through September 2014. The Honda Accord Plug-in Hybrid was introduced in Japan in June 2013 and it is available only for leasing, primarily to corporations and government agencies. As of December 2013, the Accord PHEV ranked as the third best selling plug-in hybrid in the Japanese market.

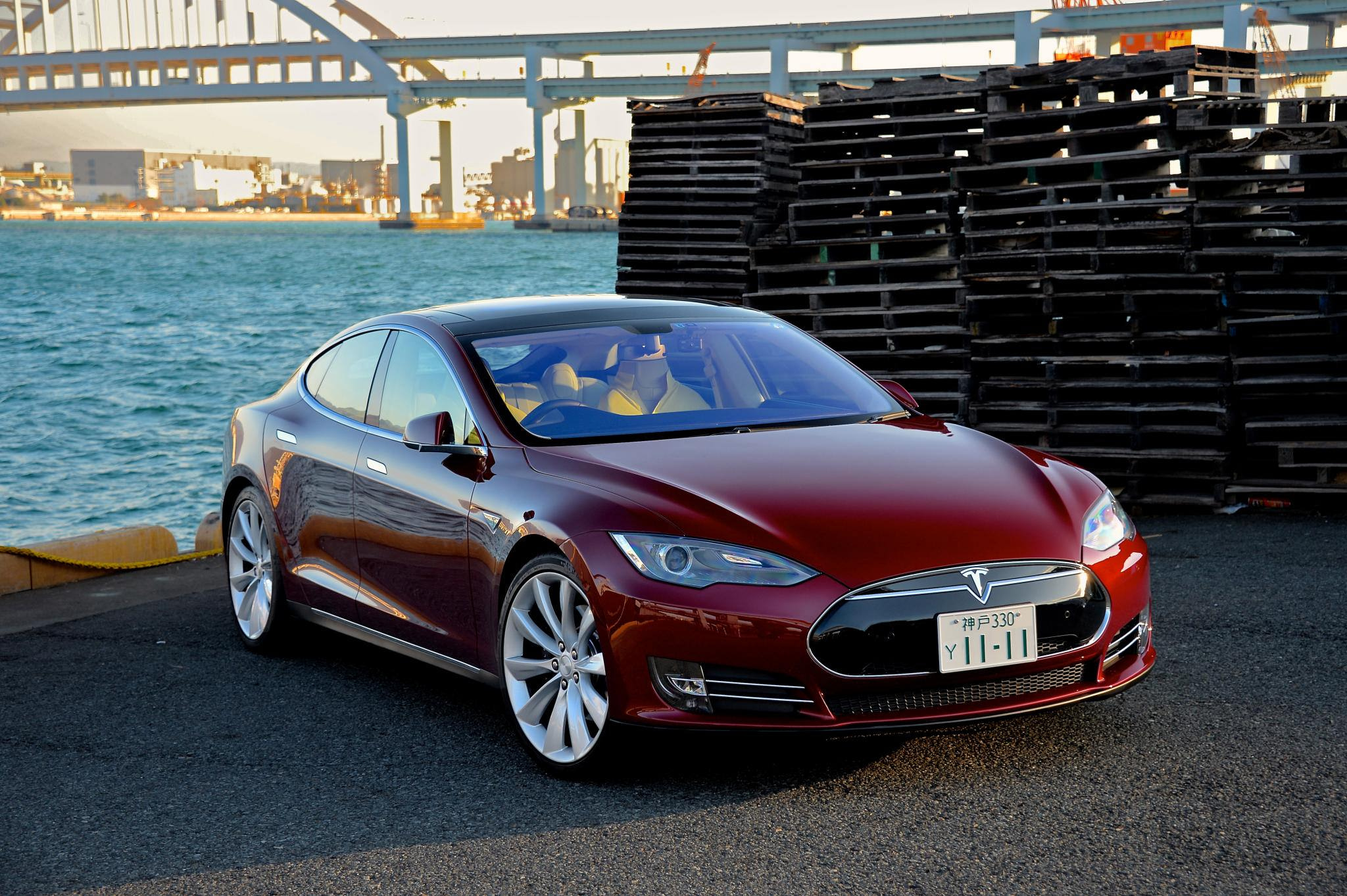
Deliveries of the Tesla Model S in Japan began in September 2014.

Sales of the plug-in electric drive segment during 2013 were led by the Nissan Leaf with 13,021 units sold, up from 11,115 in 2012, allowing the Leaf to continue as the top selling plug-in electric car in the country since 2011. Also during 2013, a total of 45 Nissan NMC all-electric low-speed neighborhood vehicles were sold in the country. Sales during the first nine months of 2014 again were led by the Nissan Leaf with 10,877 units, followed by the Outlander P-HEV with 8,630 units, together representing 78.8% of the plug-in segment sales during this period.

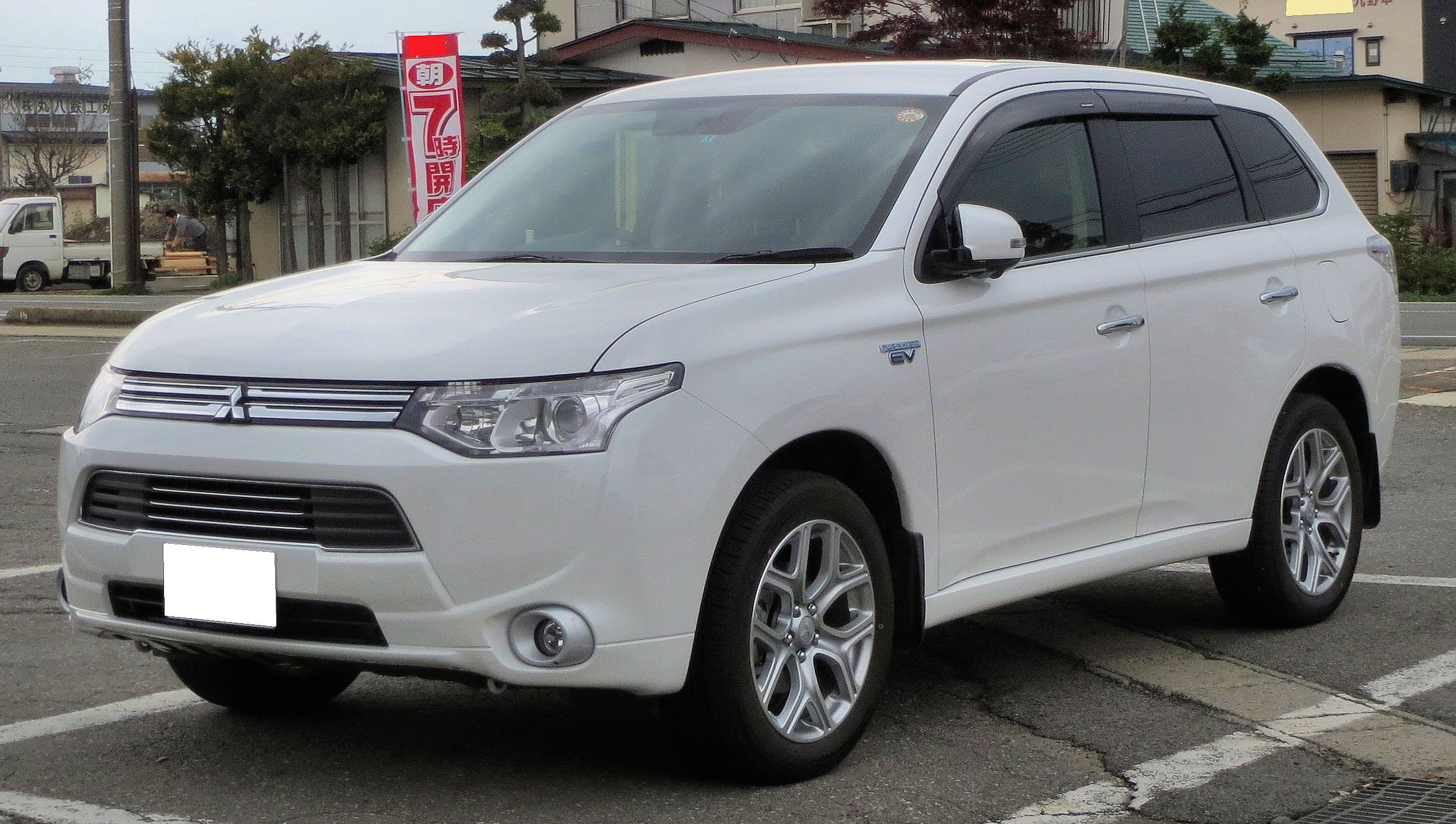
The Mitsubishi Outlander P-HEV was the top selling plug-in electric car in Japan in 2015.

Retail deliveries of the Tesla Model S began in Japan in September 2014. The Leaf continued as the market leader in 2014 for the fourth year running with 14,177 units sold, followed by the Outlander P-HEV with 10,064 units, together representing about 80% of the plug-in segment sales in Japan in 2014.

In 2015 the Outlander plug-in hybrid surpassed the Leaf as the top selling plug-in electric car in the country that year with 10,996 units sold, while the Leaf sold 9,057 units. Japan is the Outlander P-HEV largest country market with 30,668 units sold through December 2015. Nevertheless, at the end of 2015 the Nissan Leaf continued to rank as the all-time best-selling plug-in car in the country with 57,699 units sold. As of December 2015, cumulative sales of plug-in electric cars totaled 126,420 units since 2009.

During the first eight months of 2016 the Nissan Leaf led sales with 11,120 units delivered. Since December 2010, Nissan has sold 68,819 units through August 2016, making the Leaf the all-time best-selling plug-in car in the country. Between January and August 2016, a total of 4,162 Outlander P-HEVs were sold in Japan. Sales of the Outlander plug-in hybrid fell sharply from April 2016 as a result of Mitsubishi's fuel mileage scandal. Since its inception, sales of the plug-in hybrid totaled 34,830 units through August 2016.

=== Sales by model ===
The following table presents sales for the top selling highway-capable plug-in electric vehicles by year since July 2009 up to April 2016.

Top selling highway-capable plug-in electric vehicles available in the Japanese market between 2009 and April 2016
| Model^{(1)} | Market launch | Total sales | 2016 CYTD | 2015 | 2014 | 2013 | 2012 | 2011 | 2010 | 2009 |
|---|---|---|---|---|---|---|---|---|---|---|
| Nissan Leaf | Dec 2010 | 64,978 | 7,279 | 9,057 | 14,177 | 13,021 | 11,115 | 10,310 | 19 | |
| Mitsubishi Outlander P-HEV | Jan 2013 | 33,991 | 3,323 | 10,996 | 10,064 | 9,608 | | | | |
| Toyota Prius PHV | Jan 2012 | 22,100 | 148 | 1,344 | 5,187 | 4,452 | 10,970 | | | |
| Mitsubishi i-MiEV | Jul 2009 | 11,144 | 86 | 635 | 1,021 | 1,491 | 2,295 | 2,290 | 2,340 | 986 |
| Mitsubishi Minicab MiEV van | Dec 2011 | 6,172 | 111 | 501 | 865 | 1,461 | 2,487 | 747 | | |
| Mitsubishi Minicab MiEV truck | Jan 2013 | 927 | 35 | 161 | 177 | 554 | | | | |
| BMW i3 | 2014 | + 400 | NA | NA | + 400^{(2)} | | | | | |
| Total sales shown models Jul 2009 - Apr 2016 | | 139,712 | 10,982 | 22,694 | 31,891 | 30,587 | 26,867 | 13,347 | 2,359 | 986 |
Notes: (1) The Tesla Model S, Smart ED and Honda Accord Plug-in Hybrid are also available in Japan, but sales figures are not available. (2) Sales only between April and August 2014.

=== Future trends ===
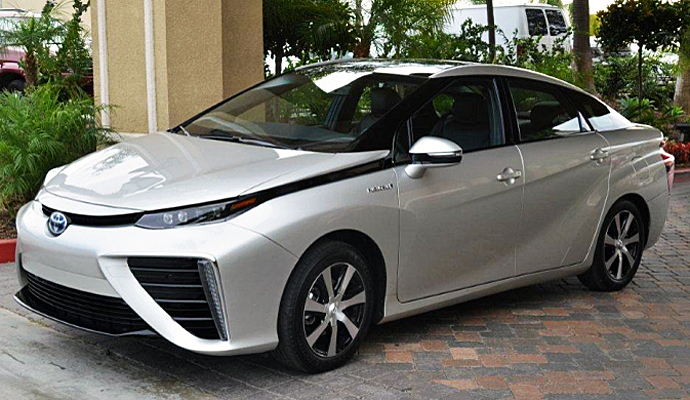
Toyota Mirai hydrogen fuel cell car

The rate of growth of the Japanese plug-in segment slowed from 2013, with annual sales falling behind Europe, the U.S. and China during 2014 and 2015. This trend reflects the Japanese government and the major domestic carmakers decision to adopt and promote hydrogen fuel cell vehicles instead of plug-in electric vehicles. The Japanese strategy aims to focus in investing heavily in fuel-cell technology and infrastructure as part of a national policy to foster what it calls a hydrogen society, where the zero-emission fuel would power homes and vehicles.

In August 2012, Toyota announced its plans to start retail sales of a hydrogen fuel-cell sedan in California in 2015. Toyota expects to become a leader in this technology. In addition, in September 2012 Toyota announced that is backing away from fully electric vehicles. The company's vice chairman, Takeshi Uchiyamada, said "The current capabilities of electric vehicles do not meet society’s needs, whether it may be the distance the cars can run, or the costs, or how it takes a long time to charge." Toyota's emphasis was to be re-focused on the hybrid concept, and 21 new hybrid gas-electric models were scheduled to be on the market by 2015.

As part of Toyota's effort to maintain its alternative propulsion lead, it launched for retail customers the Toyota Mirai hydrogen fuel cell vehicle in late 2014, and Honda plans to launch the Clarity Fuel Cell by late 2016. Toyota is responding to interest in the hydrogen economy in its home market, where, as of December 2014, there were 100,000 residential hydrogen fuel cells already installed across Japan. The country is aiming for 5.3 million households, or roughly 10%, to have fuel cells by 2030. Nevertheless, in June 2015 Toyota announced its plans to continue a strong promotion of plug-in hybrids starting with the introduction of the Prius Prime.

In September 2016, Shoichi Kaneko, assistant chief engineer for the Prius Prime, said in an interview with the website AutoblogGreen that creating the next-generation Prius will be a tremendously difficult challenge due to the physical limitations to improve the Prius' fuel economy. And considering that Toyota "wants to lead the way in reducing (and eventually eliminating) fossil fuels from its vehicles, simply making a better standard hybrid powertrain might not be enough," the carmaker is considering making every future Prius a plug-in hybrid beginning with the fifth-generation models.

== Charging infrastructure ==
The Japanese electric vehicle charging infrastructure climbed from only 60 public charging stations in early 2010 to 1,381 public quick-charge stations as of December 2012, representing the largest deployment of fast chargers in the world. The number of non-domestic slow charger points increased to around 300 units. Japan also is the country with the highest ratio of quick charging points to electric vehicles (EVSE/EV), with a ratio of 0.030 as of December 2012. There were 1,967 CHAdeMO quick charging stations across the country by April 2014. The Japanese government set up a target to deploy 2 million slow chargers and 5,000 fast charging points by 2020. Currently all Family Mart convenience stores with sufficient parking space have one space specialized for quick-charge use or are in the process of having one installed.

== Government incentives ==
The Japanese government introduced the first electric vehicle incentive program in 1996, and it was integrated in 1998 with the Clean Energy Vehicles Introduction Project, which provided subsidies and tax discounts for the purchase of electric, natural gas, methanol and hybrid electric vehicles. The project provided a purchase subsidy of up to 50% the incremental costs of a clean energy vehicle as compared with the price of a conventional engine vehicle. This program was extended until 2003.

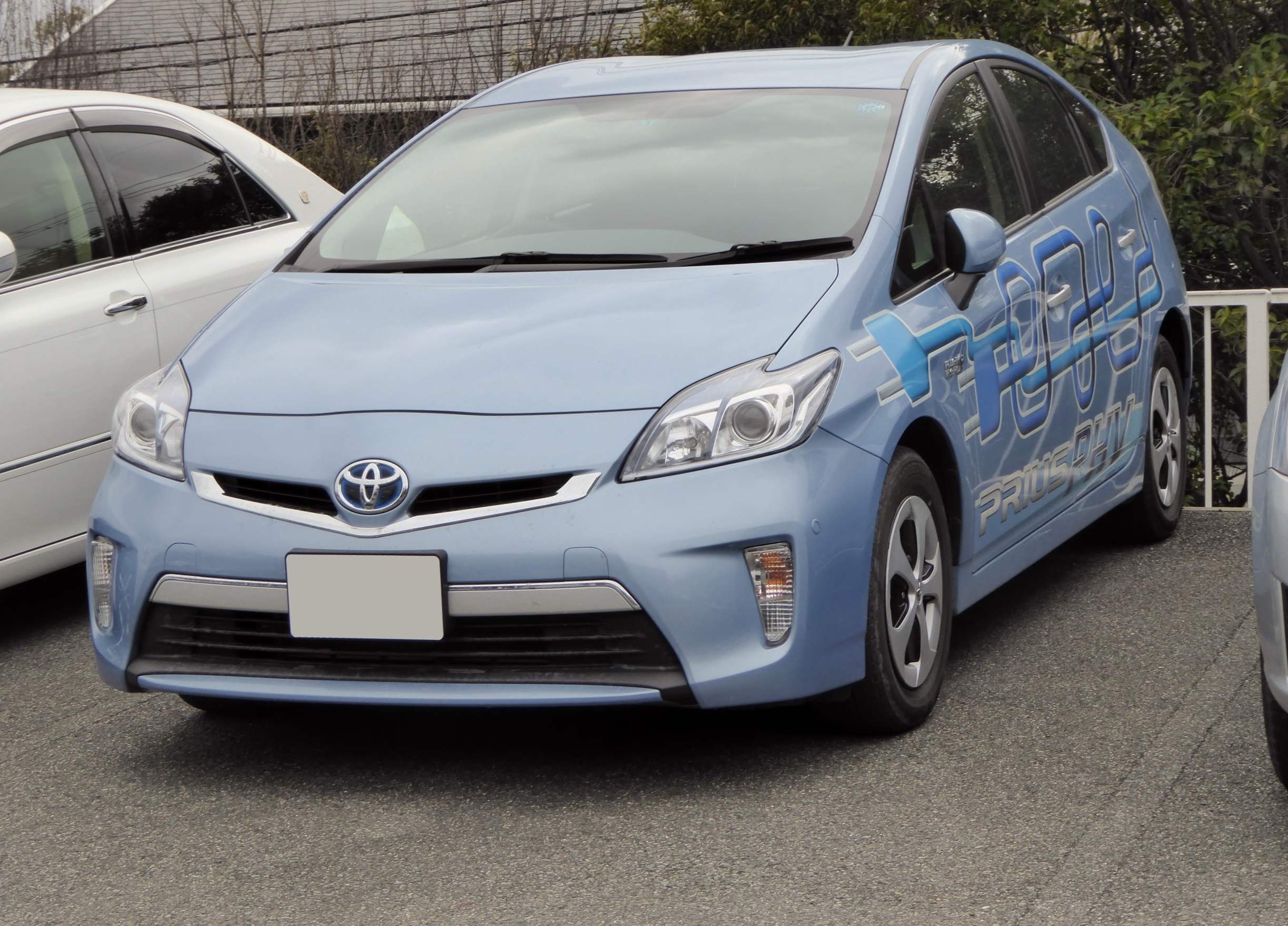
Toyota Prius PHV (first generation)

In May 2009 the Japanese Diet passed the "Green Vehicle Purchasing Promotion Measure" that went into effect on June 19, 2009, but retroactive to April 10, 2009. The program established tax deductions and exemptions for environmentally friendly and fuel efficient vehicles, according to a set of stipulated environmental performance criteria, and the requirements are applied equally to both foreign and domestically produced vehicles. The program provided purchasing subsidies for two type of cases, consumers purchasing a new passenger car without trade-in (non-replacement program), and for those consumers buying a new car trading a used car registered 13 years ago or earlier (scrappage program).

Subsidies for purchases of new environmentally friendly vehicles without scrapping a used car are 100,000 yen (~US$670) for the purchase of a standard or small car, and 50,000 yen (~US$330) for the purchase of a mini or kei vehicle. Subsidies for purchasing trucks and buses meeting the stipulated fuel efficiency and emission criteria vary between 200,000 yen (~US$1,330) to 900,000 yen (~US$6,000).

Subsidies for purchases of new environmentally friendly vehicles in the case of owners scrapping a 13-year or older vehicle are 250,000 yen (~US$1,660) for the purchase of a standard or small car, and 125,000 yen (~US$830) for the purchase of a mini or kei vehicle. Subsidies for purchasing trucks and buses meeting the stipulated fuel efficiency and emission criteria vary between 400,000 yen (~US$2,660) to 1,800,000 yen (~US$12,000).

All incentives for new purchases with or without trading were applicable in Japan's fiscal year 2009, from April 1, 2009, through March 31, 2010.

== See also ==
- Government incentives for plug-in electric vehicles
- List of modern production plug-in electric vehicles
