= Citroën C1 ev'ie =

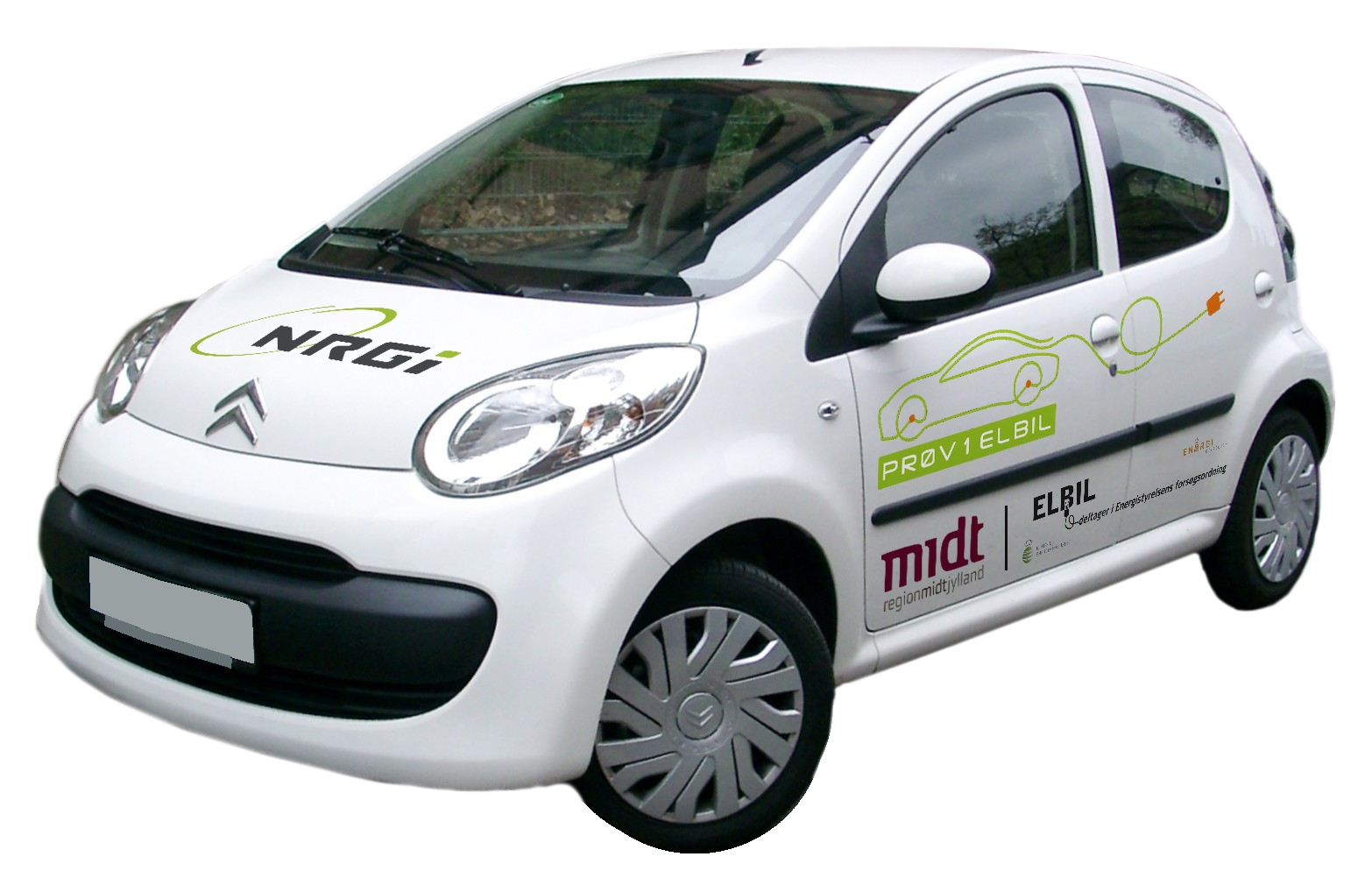

Overview
- Manufacturer: Electric Car Corporation (adapted from a Citroën C1)
- Production: 2009–2011
- Assembly: Kolín, Czech Republic and Flitwick, United Kingdom

Body and chassis
- Class: Battery electric city car
- Body style: 3-door hatchback 5-door hatchback
- Layout: FF layout
- Related: Citroën C1; Peugeot 107; Toyota Aygo

Powertrain
- Engine: 30 kW (40 hp)
- Transmission: 5-speed gearbox fixed into 3rd gear

Dimensions
- Wheelbase: 2.340 m (92.1 in)
- Length: 3.43 m (135.0 in)
- Width: 1.63 m (64.2 in)
- Height: 1.494 m (58.8 in)
- Curb weight: 890 kg

Chronology
- Successor: Citroën C-Zero

The Citroën C1 ev'ie is an electric car conversion from a standard Citroën C1 by the now defunct Electric Car Corporation. The model was first released on 30 April 2009, with a 2010 list price of £19,860 ($30,890 US) this made the C1 ev'ie a competitively priced electric car.

The Citroën C1 ev'ie's body and fittings are essentially identical to a standard C1. Differences for the electric model include a fixed-ratio transmission and regenerative braking (with ABS). The standard 5-speed gearbox is used, but fixed into 3rd gear. Regenerative braking is automatically partially applied as soon as the accelerator is released, not just when the brake pedal is pressed, making it act like engine braking, rather than coasting. ECC bought C1s and removed the engine and fuel tank, to install batteries, an electric motor, an electric heater, and an engine-management system.

By placing the batteries in place of the standard fossil fuel tank as well as in the engine compartment, no boot space is lost compared to the standard C1 model.

The car is charged from a standard household electrical outlet, in 6 hours. The range was 97–120 km after 6 hours of battery charging.

With the demise of ECC, "ev-support.co.uk" took on the final warranty work for ECC and subsequently purchased all the remaining stock of spare parts. Certain parts no longer available are now remanufactured by EV-Support.

== See also ==
- Government incentives for plug-in electric vehicles
- List of modern production plug-in electric vehicles
- Plug-in electric vehicle
