= Electric Car Corporation =

UK electric car manufacturer

Coordinates: 51.509167°N 0.156389°W

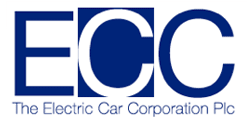

The Electric Car Corporation plc was an electric car manufacturer and dealer based in Mayfair, London with an assembly plant in Flitwick, Bedfordshire. It made and sold the Citroën C1 ev'ie, an electric car adapted from the Citroën C1. The car was first released on 30 April 2009 with a list price of £16,850 ($24,989 US). The company was dissolved in 2012.

Starting with a complete vehicle, The Electric Car Corporation removed components from the new car such as the petrol engine, transmission and other unnecessary parts. These were sold to the motor trade to offset some of the price of the initial new vehicle purchase.

== Board of directors ==
Its board of directors comprised:

- David Martell (secretary and 98% shareholder), the founder of Trafficmaster.
- Robert Williams (2% shareholder), a former Trafficmaster director.
