= Source London =

Electric vehicle charging network in England

Source London charger made by Siemens, at Oakwood tube station

Source London is a network of electric vehicle charging points in London.

Charging points are located in residential streets, public car parks, at supermarkets, shopping centres and similar places. Use of a Source London branded charging point requires registration with the network's website and the payment of an annual fee of £48 per vehicle. Users are required to pay the annual subscription (also payable in monthly instalments of £4/month) along with 3.6p/min for each charging session on their modern chargers. Registered members are issued with a card that is swiped on the charging point's card reader to permit charging an unlimited number of times.

== Backing and funding ==
Source London charging point in East Finchley, 2016

In April 2009, the Mayor of London, Boris Johnson announced an ambition to install 25,000 electric vehicle charging points. On 6 November 2010, Johnson, announced the establishment of a network of electric vehicle charging points.

The network was launched on 27 May 2011. It was the first citywide network in London It initially provided 150 charging points across the capital, increasing the total number of charging points from 250 to 400. At the time of the initial launch, there were plans to expand coverage to 1,300 charging points by 2013. In 2018, 850 charging points were available with a further 180 planned for installation by 2019. In 2020, 1,600 charging points were available.

Source London was originally a Transport for London-led consortium of public and private sector organizations. The IT infrastructure was developed by Siemens. The network is partly funded by Scottish and Southern Energy and National Car Parks. Other organisations involved include Heathrow Airport, Gatwick Airport, Asda, Capital Shopping Centres, Sainsbury's, IKEA, Whittington Hospital, Enterprise Rent-a-Car and London Underground. The Department for Transport provided £9.3 million 50% match funding for the development of the network's infrastructure. The subscription fee for the scheme was originally an annual flat-rate £100 per vehicle, without any additional fees. By 2021, the network had changed to a mode of charging roughly £40 for a full charge, with three boroughs having a higher fee than the other boroughs.

Bolloré's IER subsidiary took over the management of the Source London charging network from Transport for London in 2014. Most of the actual charge points are still owned by the boroughs and business owners, and it is still their responsibility to fix faults. In January 2021, the majority shareholder changed from Bolloré's IER subsidiary to Total UK Limited.

Source London planned for its expansion to be achieved, in part, by integrating existing charging points previously operated independently by London Borough councils. By September 2011 13 boroughs had joined the scheme. By 2016, 16 boroughs had joined the scheme.

Source London received funding from the Department for Transport's Office for Low Emission Vehicles with the aim of developing a national charging point network.

== Maintenance ==
In 2014 it was reported that Source London's network, formed by taking on operational responsibility for various borough's charging points, had problems with chargepoints being out of action. In 2015, Source London sought to take over control of maintenance of the network from the individual boroughs.
