= Automotive industry in the Czech Republic =

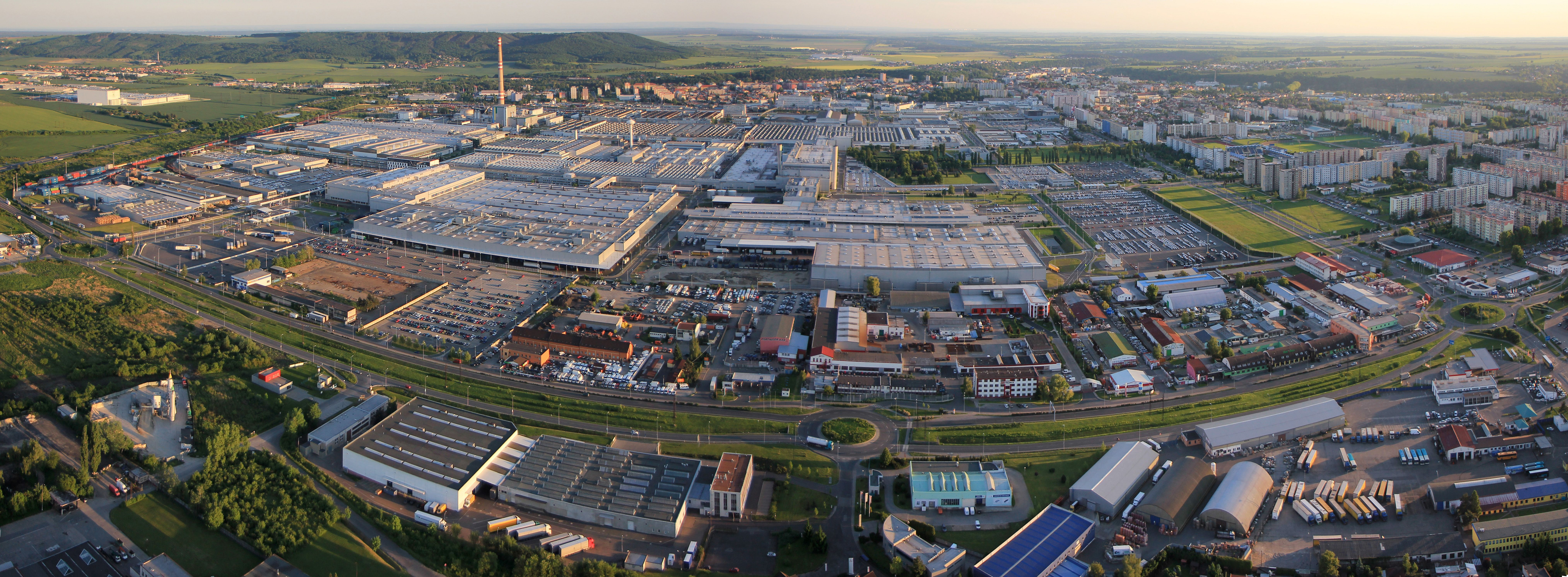
Škoda factory in Mladá Boleslav

The automotive industry in the Czech Republic is a major part of the country's manufacturing sector. Škoda Auto is its largest passenger-car manufacturer, alongside plants operated by Hyundai and Toyota. In 2025, car production totalled 1.45 million vehicles, of which about 92.5% were exported.

The country also manufactures trucks, buses, motorcycles and trailers. Tatra Trucks produces trucks, while Iveco Czech Republic and SOR Libchavy are major bus manufacturers. A substantial component-supplier sector forms part of international automotive production networks, with particularly close links to Germany.

Privatisation and foreign investment reshaped the industry after 1989. Volkswagen Group acquired a stake in Škoda in 1991 and became its sole owner in 2000. A joint venture between Toyota and PSA Peugeot Citroën began production in Kolín in 2005, while Hyundai Motor Manufacturing Czech began production in Nošovice in 2008.

The Czech automotive industry also includes a large component-supplier sector, including multinational companies such as Forvia and Czech-owned manufacturers like Brano Group.

== History ==
=== Origins and interwar development ===
The mechanic Josef Božek demonstrated a steam-powered carriage in Prague in 1815. Automobile manufacturing began towards the end of the nineteenth century, when the Czech lands were part of Austria-Hungary.

The first factory-built petrol-engined car in the Czech lands, the Präsident, was built by Nesselsdorfer Wagenbau in Kopřivnice in 1897. Laurin & Klement, founded in Mladá Boleslav in 1895 to manufacture bicycles, began making cars in 1905. In Prague, Praga began manufacturing cars in 1907, initially using other manufacturers’ designs.

The Tatra name first appeared on cars built in Kopřivnice in 1919. In 1923, the company introduced the Tatra 11, with a backbone chassis and swinging half-axles. In 1924, Praga began making the Piccolo, which was smaller and cheaper than its previous models.

Laurin & Klement merged with Škoda Works in 1925. Its cars were subsequently sold under the Škoda name, and investment in the Mladá Boleslav factory brought new buildings and assembly lines. Vehicle production grew during the later 1920s. Praga led the sales of passenger cars in the late 1920s and early 1930s.

In 1934, the Škoda Popular helped revive the company's sales with its low price and lightweight design. Tatra's new model that year was the Tatra 77, with streamlined bodywork and a rear-mounted, air-cooled V8 engine.

=== German occupation and World War II ===
Under German occupation, automotive manufacturers in the Czech lands were required to produce vehicles and equipment for the German war effort. Škoda's automotive subsidiary became part of Reichswerke Hermann Göring in August 1939. Its Mladá Boleslav factory made components for military vehicles and aircraft, cartridge cases and other weapons parts. Vehicle assembly continued in declining numbers.

Tatra was tasked with developing and producing the Tatra 111 truck for military use. Jawa was ordered to manufacture military equipment, including fuel pumps, bomb racks and generators. Its engineers also secretly continued developing civilian vehicles. Passenger-car production across Czechoslovakia fell from about 13,900 in 1938 to 1,700 in 1944.

Towards the end of the war, Praga's factory in Prague was largely destroyed in the American air raid of 25 March 1945. Soviet bombing badly damaged Škoda's Mladá Boleslav factory on 9 May, but vehicle production resumed in June.

=== Nationalisation and central planning ===
The major automotive manufacturers were nationalised in 1945, and Škoda became a separate national enterprise in 1946. After the communist takeover in February 1948, Soviet-style central planning brought further reorganisation. Small passenger cars were assigned to Škoda. Tatra retained both truck production and a range of larger cars, supplied mainly to officials and senior managers. Other truck makers were Praga, Avia and, from the 1950s, LIAZ.

In the 1950s, about two-thirds of the passenger cars built in Czechoslovakia were sold abroad. Sales to Western markets brought in foreign currency, which the country needed to buy machinery and materials.

A new production complex opened in Mladá Boleslav in 1964 to build the Škoda 1000 MB. The increase in output helped bring car ownership to more households, and the 1000 MB and its rear-engined successors became common family cars.

In 1968, Avia began making light trucks based on French Saviem designs. Tatra’s role as a supplier of heavy off-road trucks within Comecon led to a major expansion of its Kopřivnice factory during the 1970s, where production of the Tatra 815 began in 1983.

Škoda’s attempts to replace its rear-engined cars made slower progress. A joint project with East German manufacturers failed during the 1970s, leaving the company to continue updating its existing range. Škoda unveiled the front-wheel-drive Favorit in 1987, with a body designed by Bertone.

=== Privatisation and foreign investment ===
In the early 1990s, manufacturers lost orders from former Comecon markets just as demand was falling at home. As state-owned manufacturers were privatised, Tatra, LIAZ and Avia struggled with the loss of orders and cut production.

Škoda found a foreign partner in Volkswagen Group, which acquired a 31% stake in 1991 and became its sole owner in 2000. Investment in its factories accompanied the introduction of the Felicia in 1994 and the Octavia in 1996. The Octavia was the first Škoda based on a Volkswagen Group platform and was built in a new assembly plant in Mladá Boleslav. Changes extended to component production, where foreign suppliers bought Czech manufacturers or opened factories of their own.

Tatra withdrew from passenger-car production in the late 1990s to concentrate on trucks. Karosa became part of the Renault–Iveco joint venture Irisbus in 1999 and was renamed Iveco Czech Republic in 2007.

Passenger-car production expanded with the construction of factories in Kolín and Nošovice. Toyota and PSA Peugeot Citroën began making the Toyota Aygo, Peugeot 107 and Citroën C1 in Kolín in February 2005. Their joint venture involved an investment of approximately €1.3 billion. Hyundai followed in November 2008, when its Nošovice factory began producing the i30.

In January 2021, Toyota took full ownership of the Kolín factory and renamed it Toyota Motor Manufacturing Czech Republic.

== Vehicle production ==
=== Passenger cars ===
| Manufacturer | Assembly locations | 2023 | 2024 | 2025 |
|---|---|---|---|---|
| Škoda Auto | Mladá Boleslav and Kvasiny | 864,889 | 896,933 | 947,140 |
| Hyundai Motor Manufacturing Czech | Nošovice | 340,500 | 330,890 | 276,175 |
| Toyota Motor Manufacturing Czech Republic | Kolín | 192,427 | 225,058 | 222,461 |
| Total | | 1,397,816 | 1,452,881 | 1,445,776 |

Škoda builds cars in Mladá Boleslav and Kvasiny, while its Vrchlabí factory makes transmissions. Mladá Boleslav produces both combustion-engined and electric models, including the Enyaq and Elroq.

Toyota manufactures the Yaris and Aygo X in Kolín, where production of the hybrid Aygo X began in 2025.

=== Commercial vehicles ===
| Manufacturer | Vehicle category | 2023 | 2024 | 2025 |
|---|---|---|---|---|
| Tatra Trucks | Trucks | 1,432 | 1,522 | 1,349 |
| Iveco Czech Republic | Buses | 4,741 | 4,040 | 5,143 |
| SOR Libchavy | Buses | 492 | 416 | 480 |

Tatra Trucks manufactures heavy trucks in Kopřivnice for armed forces, emergency services and civilian customers in construction, mining and agriculture.

Iveco Czech Republic builds Crossway intercity buses and Evadys coaches in Vysoké Mýto, including electric versions of the Crossway.

== Automotive suppliers ==
The Czech Republic has a large automotive supplier industry, producing components for car manufacturers both in the country and abroad. In 2025, suppliers belonging to the Czech Automotive Industry Association (AutoSAP) employed 78,944 people and recorded sales of CZK 599.5 billion.

Major foreign-owned suppliers operating in the country include Bosch, Continental, Hyundai Mobis, Schaeffler, Forvia, Denso and Magna. They manufacture a wide range of products, including tires, seats, mechanical parts and electronic systems. Valeo, ZF Friedrichshafen and Aumovio also have manufacturing and development operations in the country.

Continental Barum operates a large tyre factory in Otrokovice, which is Continental's largest in Europe. The plant has an annual production capacity of around 21.5 million tyres for passenger cars, trucks, buses and other vehicles.

Japanese AGC operates one of Europe's largest automotive glass factories in Bílina-Chudeřice. The factory makes about 32 million pieces of automotive glass each year, mainly windscreens, side windows and rear windows.

Among Czech-owned suppliers are Brano Group, which produces locks, hinges and other vehicle components, and Promet Group, whose subsidiary Tawesco manufactures pressed and welded body parts.

Some suppliers are also expanding into electric vehicle components. Aisin is investing in production of electric-drive units for BMW at its plant in Písek, with production scheduled to begin in 2027.

== Research and development ==
Škoda Auto carries out vehicle development in Mladá Boleslav, including simulation, prototype construction and testing of powertrains and thermal-management systems.

Bosch has development teams in Prague, České Budějovice and Jihlava. Valeo's Prague centre develops driver-assistance and thermal-management systems, with vehicle testing at Milovice. ZF has development centres in Plzeň, Zlín, Jablonec nad Nisou and Liberec, working on software, mechanical components and vehicle systems.

Porsche Engineering has teams in Prague and Ostrava developing vehicle software and electronic systems, alongside work on simulations and body engineering. Their projects include battery-management software for the Porsche Taycan and systems for controlling adjustable suspension.

In 2023, BMW opened its Future Mobility Development Center near Sokolov. The 600-hectare proving ground is used to develop and test automated driving and parking functions.

== See also ==
- List of automobile manufacturers of the Czech Republic
