= Car body configurations =

Auto design layouts

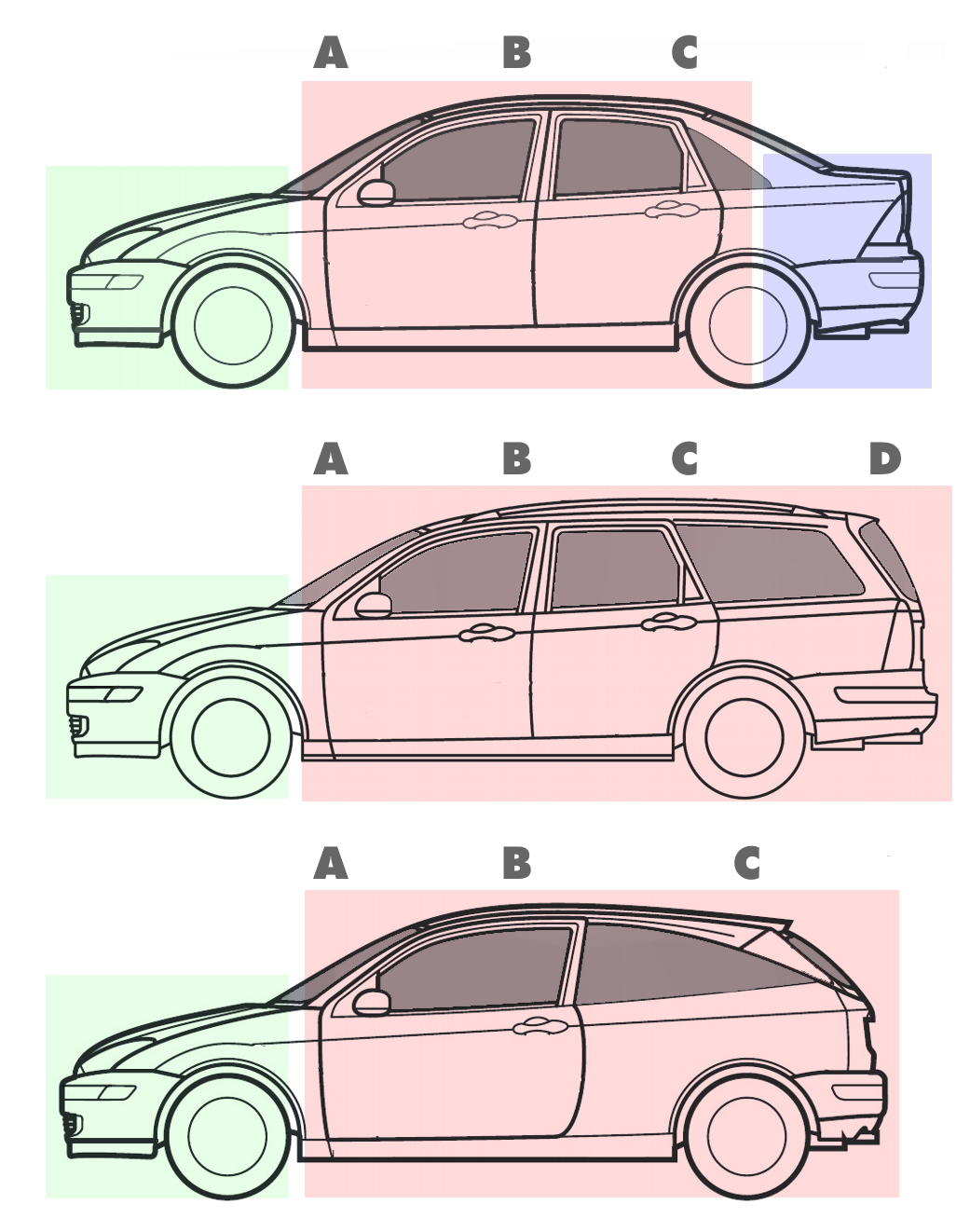
Typical pillar configurations of a sedan/saloon (three box), station wagon/estate (two box), and hatchback (two box) from the same model range

The configuration of a car body is typically determined by the layout of the engine, passenger and luggage compartments, which can be shared or separately articulated. A key design feature is the car's roof-supporting pillars, designated from front to rear of the car as A-pillar, B-pillar, C-pillar and D-pillar.

Common car body configurations are one-box (e.g., a van/minivan/MPV), two-box (e.g., a hatchback/SUV) and three-box (e.g., a sedan/saloon) designs.

== One-box design ==
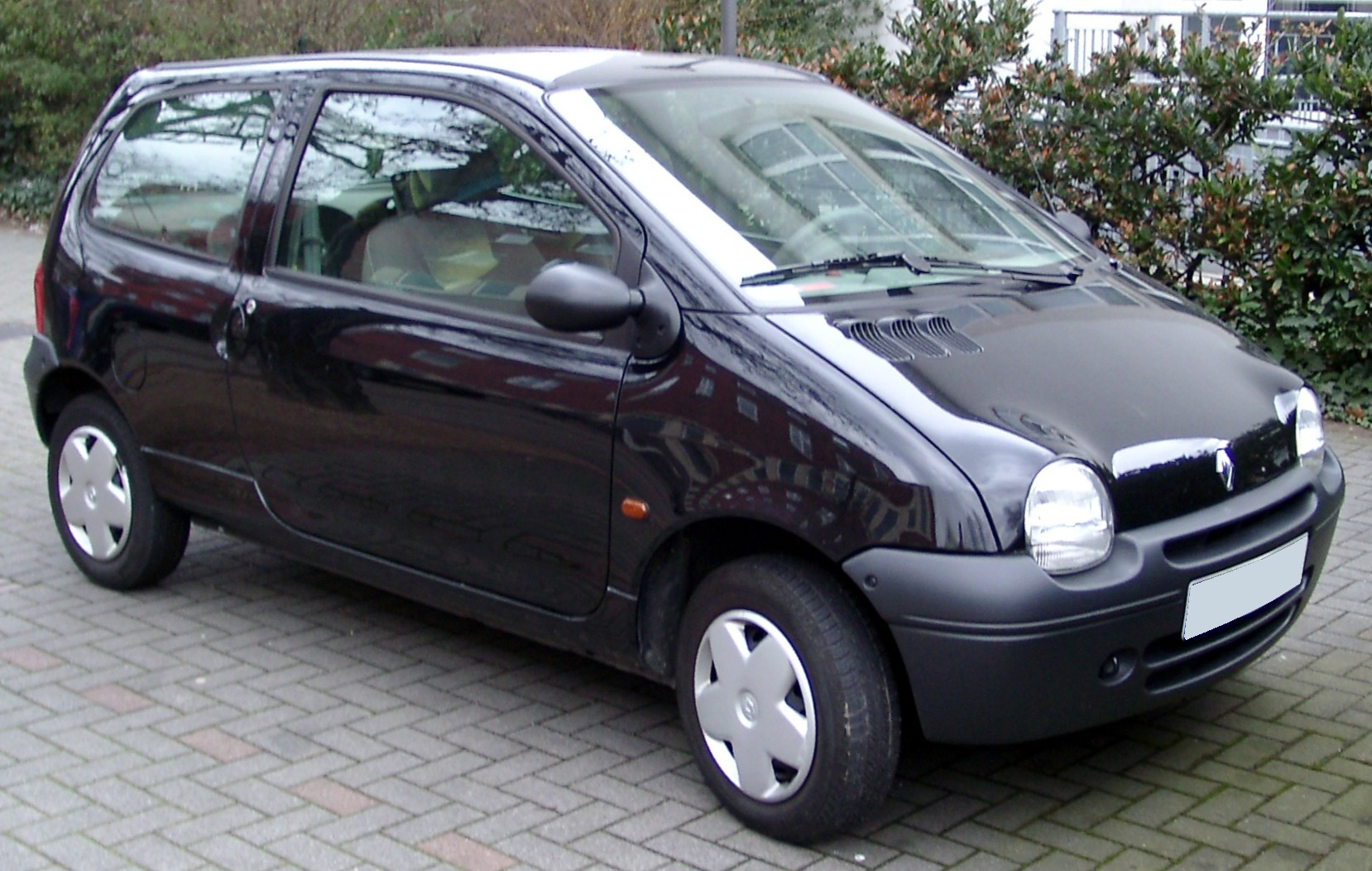
A one-box design, the Renault Twingo (1998–2000)

A one-box design, also called a monospace, mono-box or monovolume configuration, approximates in shape a single volume comprising engine, cabin and cargo areas, in part by locating the base of a vehicle's A-pillars further forward.

One-box designs include light commercial vehicles, minivans, MPVs and mini MPVs. Passenger cars with a one-box design include the 1984 Renault Espace, 1992 Renault Twingo I, 2008 Tata Nano, 2005 Toyota Aygo/Citroën C1/Peugeot 107 and 1997 Mercedes-Benz A-Class.

== Two-box design ==
Two-box designs articulate a volume for engine and a volume that combines passenger and cargo volumes, e.g., station wagon/estate or (three or five-door) hatchbacks like the Saab 900, 2001 Volkswagen Polo Mk4 and 1999 Skoda Fabia Mk1, and minivans like the Chrysler Pacifica.

== Three-box design ==
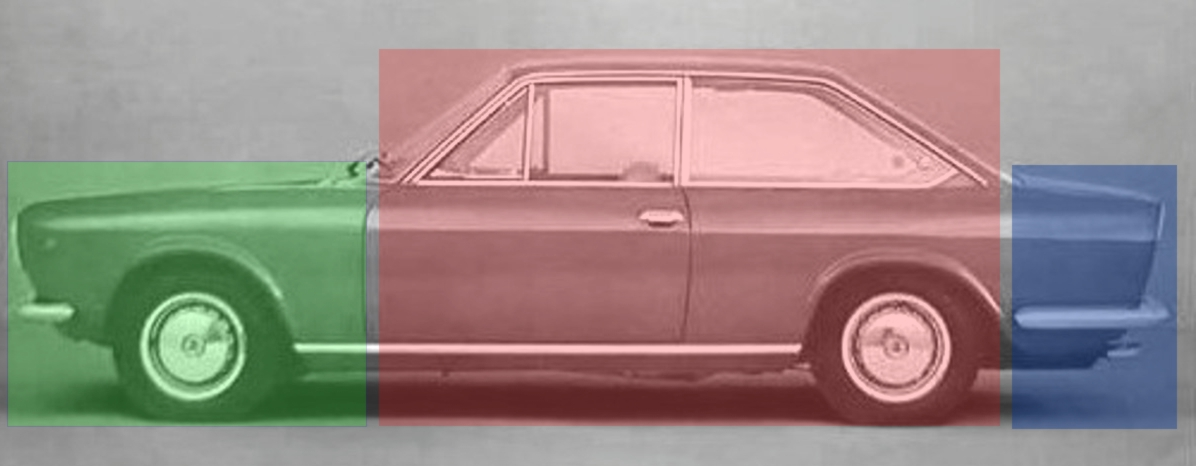
A three-box coupé, the Fiat 124

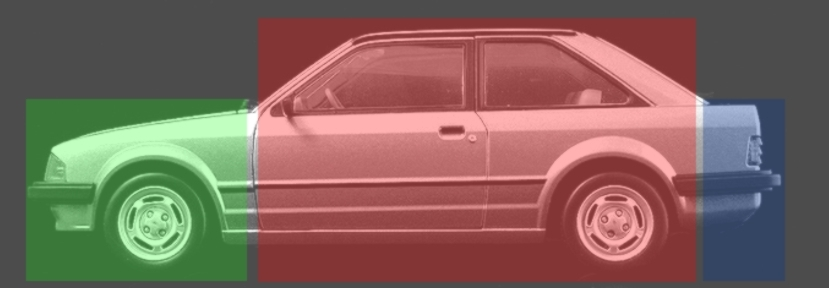
A three-box hatchback, the European Ford Escort

A three-box sedan/saloon, the Renault Dauphine

Three-box design is a broad automotive styling term describing a coupé, sedan/saloon, notchback or hatchback where when viewed in profile principal volumes are articulated into three separate compartments or boxes: engine, passenger and cargo, However, A three-box sedan and a three-box coupe are generally both smaller than a conventional cab truck and a standard bus.

Three-box designs are highly variable. Hemmings Motor News said:

These three boxes, compartmentalized as they are, are used to denote distinct areas of an automobile—specifically a sedan. The engine under the hood and surrounding compartment is the first box. The passenger seating area is another, or second box. The last or third box is the cargo or trunk area. There is no rule as to which box needs to be where.

Where the Renault Dauphine is a three-box that carries its engine in the rear and its cargo up front, the styling of the Škoda Octavia integrates a hatchback with the articulation of a three-box. This style was later used by its larger Škoda Superb, which marketed as the TwinDoor, within the liftgate operable as a trunk lid or as a full hatchback. As with the third generation European Ford Escort (also a hatchback), the third box may be vestigial. And three-box styling does not need to be boxy: Car Design News calls the fluid and rounded Fiat Linea a three-box design—and most examples of the markedly bulbous styling of the ponton genre are three-box designs.

In 2012, Hemmings Motor News wrote "the three-box sedan design is seen as traditional or—worse—conventional." By 2016 In the United States, the three-box sedan began to wane in popularity. In 2018, the Wall Street Journal wrote: "from gangster getaway cars and the Batmobile to the humble family sedan, the basic three-box configuration of a passenger car—low engine compartment, higher cabin, low trunk in the rear—has endured for decades as the standard shape of the automobile. Until now."

Sales and popularity of four-door notchback sedans/saloons began declining in Europe since mid-1990s, especially affordable ones. This is resulted in moving production of Volkswagen Jetta in Mexico, as well as the Peugeot abandoning that segment since 2001 when the production of Peugeot 306 ended. Other, predominantly European manufacturers followed suit, with the most recent generation of Opel Astra may no longer to be offered as the four-door notchback. Since 2018, Ford reduced sales of four-door Focus as well as Mondeo to Eastern Balkans markets. Again, Volkswagen stopped sales of Jetta in Europe around the same time due to too long dimensions, exceeding those with International Passat B8.

== Car roof classification ==
A related classification is based on the style of roof in the car design. The DrivAer aerodynamics model of the Technical University of Munich classifies roof styles as (F) Fastback, (E) Estate Back, (N) Notchback/Sedan.

== Motorsport applications ==
The bodies of stock cars can be modified for motorsport purposes while retaining their main characteristics. The DrivAer high-performance (hp) configuration, a parametric academic model, provides an open-source wind tunnel dataset and serves as a benchmark, particularly valuable when combined with the original DrivAer Fastback (F) variation variant for aerodynamic analysis. Aero kits applied are in line with those found in motorsport categories like European DTM and American NASCAR series.

== See also ==
- Ponton styling
- Coke bottle styling
- Glossary of automotive design
