= Peugeot 108 =

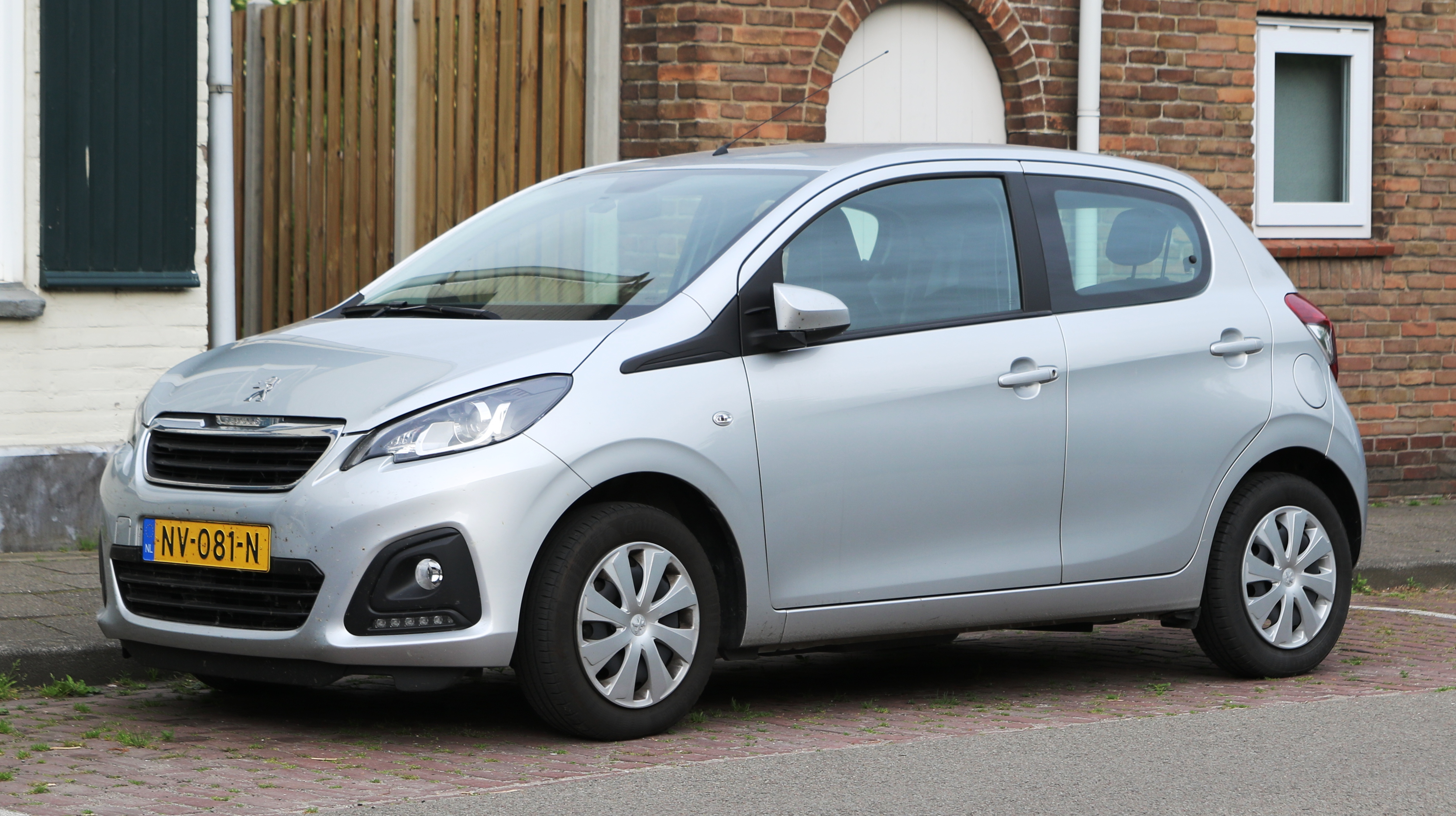

Overview
- Manufacturer: TPCA
- Also called: Citroen C1 Toyota Aygo
- Production: July 2014 – January 2022
- Assembly: Czech Republic: Kolín (TPCA)
- Designer: Sébastien Criquet

Body and chassis
- Class: City car (A)
- Body style: 3-door hatchback 5-door hatchback
- Layout: Front-engine, front-wheel-drive
- Related: Citroën C1; Toyota Aygo

Powertrain
- Engine: 1.0 L 1KR-FE I3 (petrol) (2014-2018); 1.2 L EB2-F I3 (petrol) (2014-2018); 1.0 L 1KR-B52 I3 (petrol) (2018-)

Dimensions
- Curb weight: 840–956 kg (1,852–2,108 lb)

Chronology
- Predecessor: Peugeot 107

The Peugeot 108 is a city car launched by French manufacturer Peugeot in March 2014 at the Geneva Motor Show. The 108 is related to the Citroën C1 and Toyota Aygo, and shares their floorpan, engines, transmission and electrics. Sales commenced in June 2014 in Mainland Europe and in July 2014 in the United Kingdom.

The model, along with the Citroën C1, was phased out on January 1, 2022, when Toyota took full ownership of the plant in the Czech Republic, and announced the model would not be renewed. Production ended without any direct successor. The cars were all built in the TPCA factory in the Czech Republic for nearly seven years.

== Overview ==
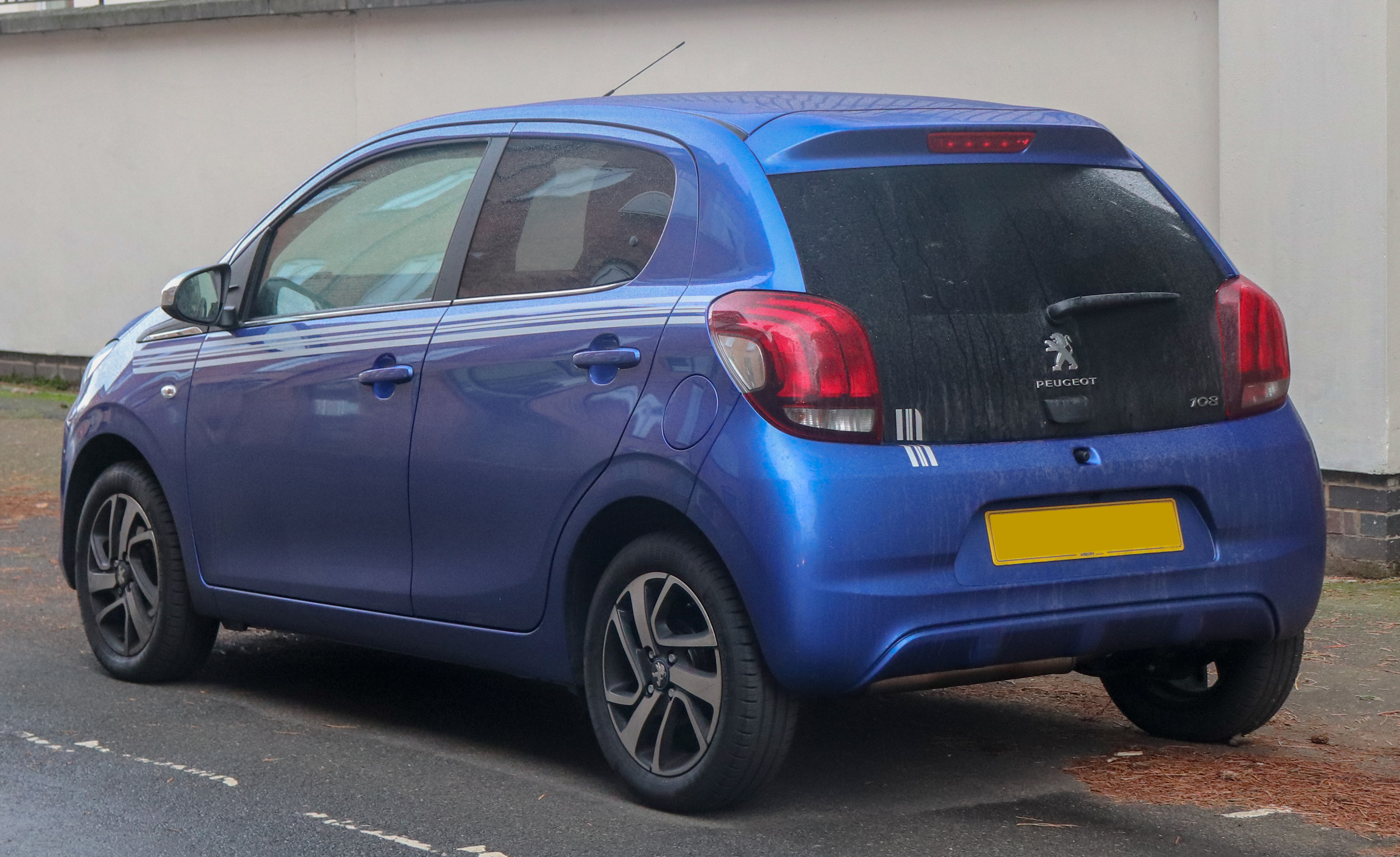
Rear view (5-door)

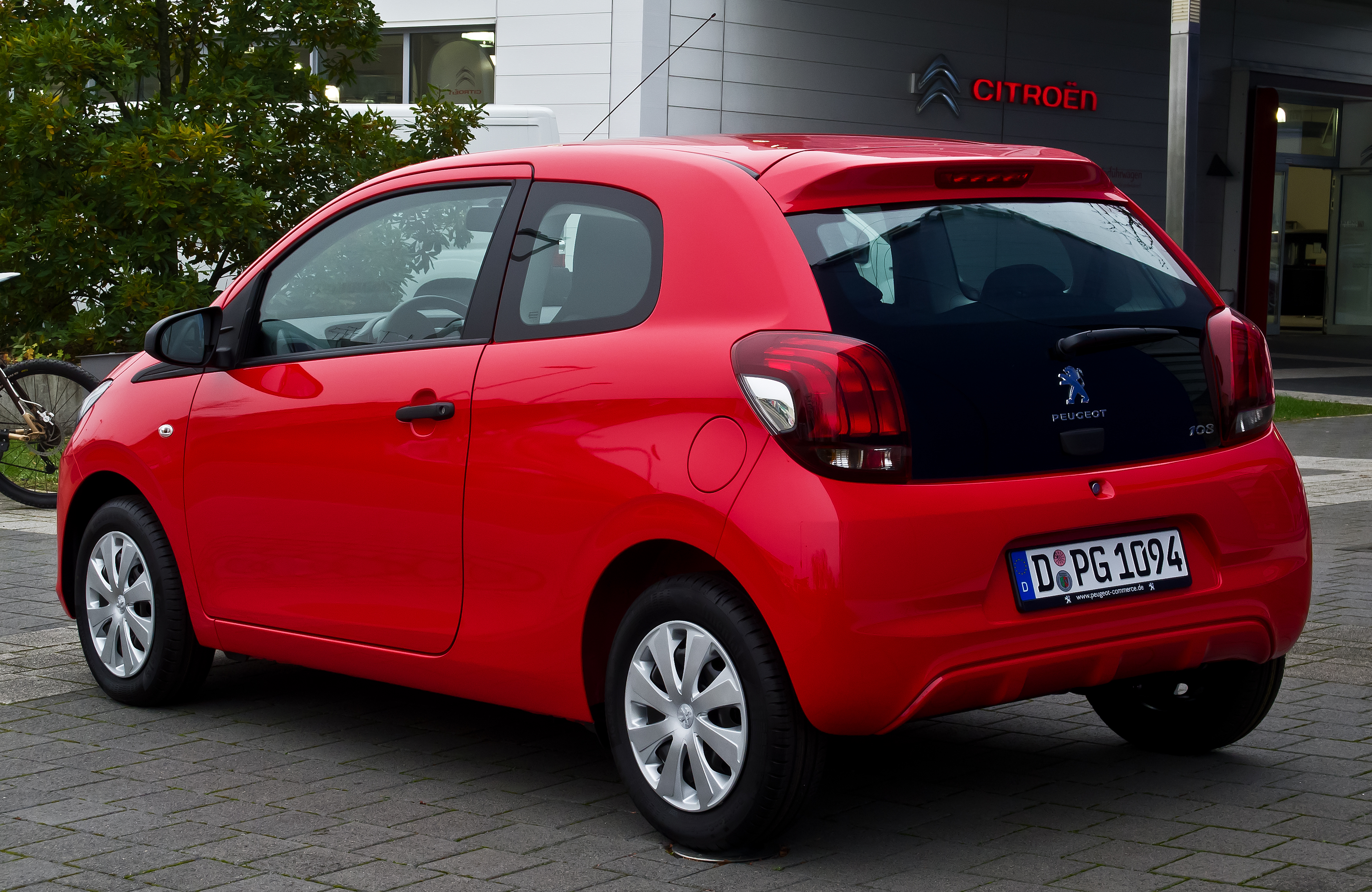
Rear view (3-door)

The 108 was powered by a choice of two three-cylinder petrol engines between 2014 and 2018; A 1.0 L Toyota 3-Cylinder with 69 PS, and a 1.2 L PSA 3-Cylinder with 83 PS. From 2018 onwards these engines were replaced with a revised 1.0 L Toyota 3-cylinder with 72 PS.

Peugeot introduced an updated interior in the spring of 2018 with new seat upholstery. There were no exterior changes.

=== Trim levels ===
- Access - the base spec model.
- Active - step above Access, comes with a number of features such as air conditioning, bluetooth, DAB radio, and a touchscreen. Active later replaced Access as the lowest base spec.
- Allure - step above Active, comes with keyless entry, reversing camera, electric heated door mirrors.
- Collection - step above Allure, adds automatic air conditioning and additional cosmetic changes.
- Feline - a high spec trim, with leather seats, and 1.2l engine as standard
- GT Line - a 'sporty' themed trim. Replaced the Feline Nav trim.
- Roland Garros - special edition, comes with a number of unique cosmetic changes and climate control.

=== Engines ===
Petrol engine
| Name | Year | Engine model | Displacement | Power | Torque | 0–100 km/h (0–62 mph) | Top speed | Fuel economy (NEDC) | CO_{2} emission (g/km) |
|---|---|---|---|---|---|---|---|---|---|
| 1.0 VTi 68 | 2014-2018 | 1.0 L 1KR-FE I3 | 998 cc | 69 PS (51 kW; 68 hp) at 6,000 rpm | 95 N⋅m (70 lbf⋅ft) at 4,300 rpm | 13.0 s | 160 km/h (99 mph) | 4.1 L/100 km (69 mpg_{‑imp}; 57 mpg_{‑US}) | 90 |
| 1.2 PureTech | 2014-2018 | 1.2 L EB2-F I3 | 1199 cc | 83 PS (61 kW; 82 hp) at 5,750 rpm | 117 N⋅m (86 lbf⋅ft) at 2,750 rpm | 11.0 s | 171 km/h (106 mph) | 4.3 L/100 km (66 mpg_{‑imp}; 55 mpg_{‑US}) | 99 |
| 1.0 VTi 72 | 2019-2022 | 1.0 L 1KR-B52 I3 | 998 cc | 72 PS (53 kW; 71 hp) at 6,000 rpm | 93 N⋅m (69 lbf⋅ft) at 4,400 rpm | 12.6 s | 160 km/h (99 mph) | 3.8 L/100 km (74 mpg_{‑imp}; 62 mpg_{‑US}) | 86 |

The 108 shares its powertrain and specifications with the Aygo and C1.

== Discontinuation ==
In 2018, it was reported that the model, along with the Citroën C1, would be phased out by 2021, when Toyota took full ownership of the plant in the Czech Republic, and the model would not be renewed.

== Sales ==
| Year | Europe |
|---|---|
| 2014 | 31,087 |
| 2015 | 68,522 |
| 2016 | 63,561 |
| 2017 | 55,831 |
| 2018 | 57,257 |
| 2019 | 54,230 |
| 2020 | 43,629 |
| 2021 | 34,689 |
| 2022 | 3,875 |
