= Citroën C1 =

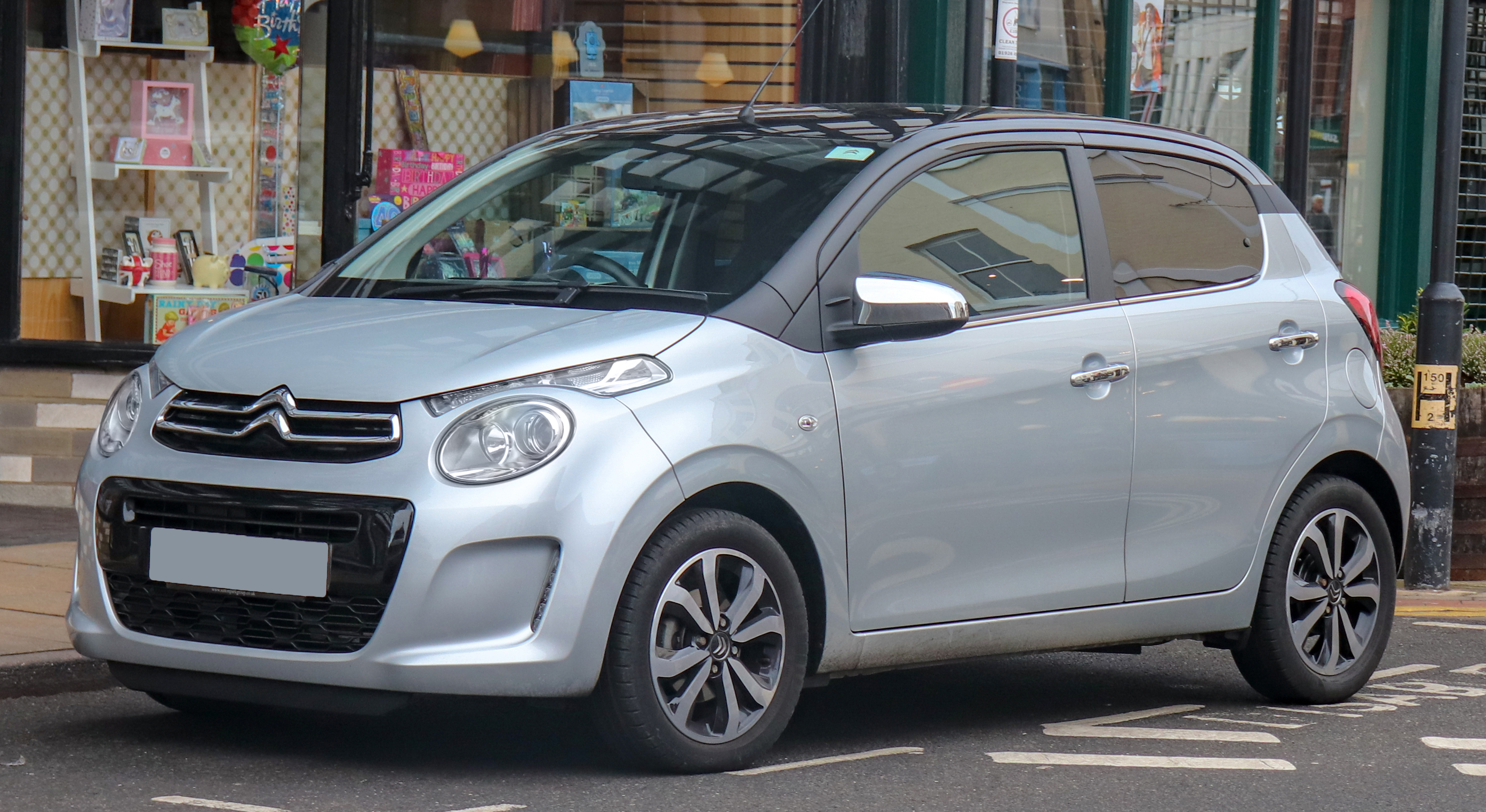
- The second generation Citroën C1

Overview
- Manufacturer: TPCA
- Production: June 2005 – January 2022
- Assembly: Czech Republic: Kolín (TPCA)

Body and chassis
- Class: City car (A)
- Related: Peugeot 107 (2005–2014); Peugeot 108; Toyota Aygo

Chronology
- Successor: Citroën Ami; Citroën C3

The Citroën C1 is a city car marketed by Citroën from June 2005 to January 2022, originally developed as part of the B-Zero project by PSA Peugeot Citroën in a joint venture with Toyota, with two generations produced.

The C1 was developed along with two badge engineered variants, the Peugeot 107, which is mostly identical to the C1 aside from its front bumper fascia and front and rear lights, and the Toyota Aygo, which is slightly more differentiated. The three siblings debuted at the 2005 Geneva Motor Show and were manufactured at the facilities of the TPCA joint venture (Toyota Peugeot Citroën Automobile) in the city of Kolín, Czech Republic.

== First generation (PM/PN; 2005) ==
First generation
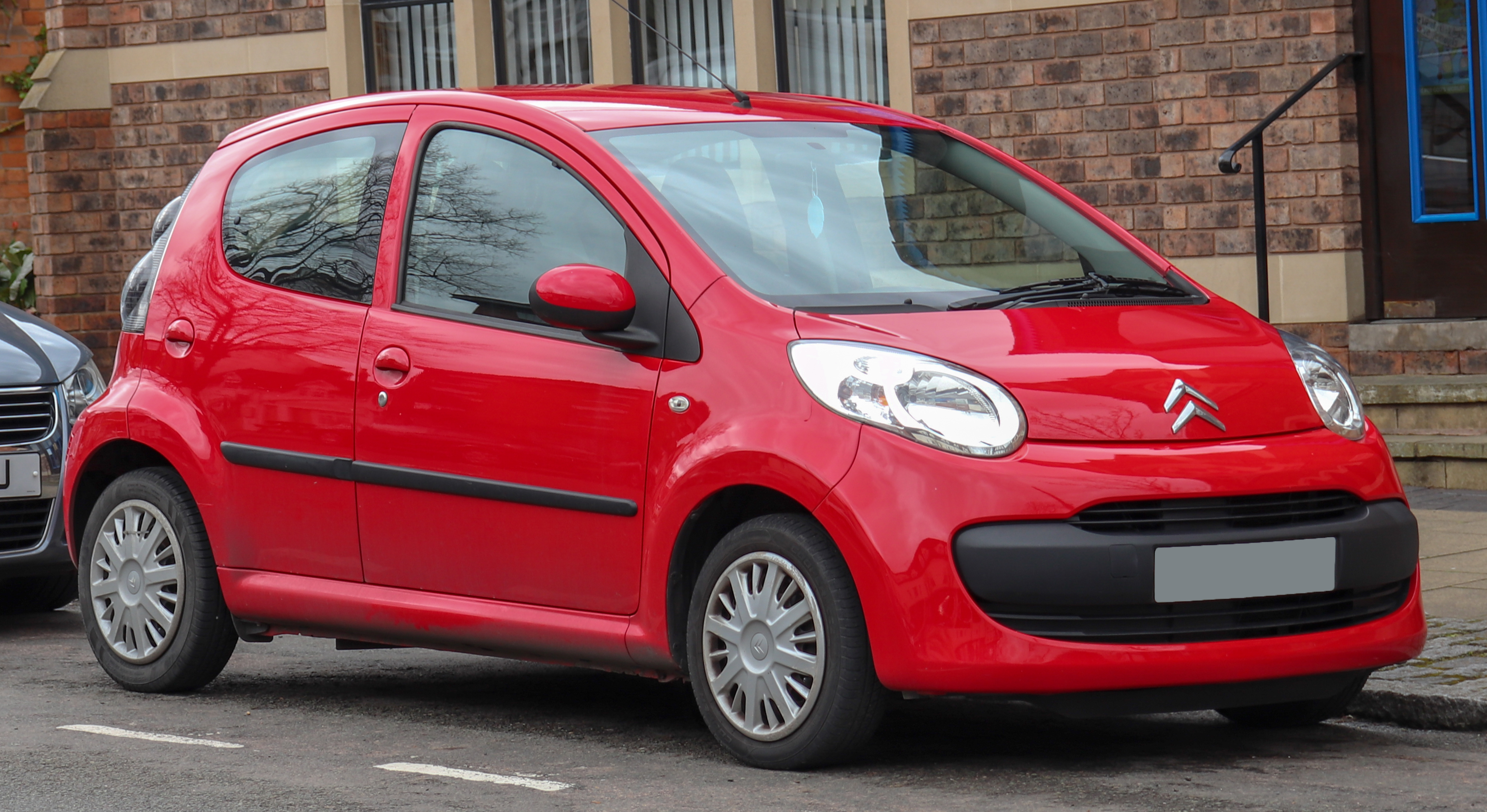
- 2008 Citroen C1 Rhythm

Overview
- Also called: Citroën C1 eco (Greece)
- Production: June 2005 – 2014
- Designer: Donato Coco

Body and chassis
- Body style: 3-door hatchback; 5-door hatchback
- Layout: Front-engine, front-wheel-drive

Powertrain
- Engine: 1.0 L Toyota 1KR-FE VTi I3 (petrol); 1.4 L DV4-TD HDi I4 (diesel)
- Transmission: 5-speed manual; 5-speed automated manual (Sensodrive,MCP)

Dimensions
- Wheelbase: 2,340 mm (92.1 in)
- Length: 3,435 mm (135.2 in)
- Width: 1,630 mm (64.2 in)
- Height: 1,465 mm (57.7 in)
- Kerb weight: 790–890 kg (1,740–1,960 lb)

The C1's body was designed by Donato Coco in a one-box configuration. On both the five door C1 and 107, though not the Aygo, the rear tail light cluster extends from the edge of the rear doors to the rear window, without a distinctly expressed "C-pillar". The C1 is powered by a 1.0 L three cylinder engine, which has a fuel economy of 61.4 mpg (UK gallons EU method; 4.6 L/100 km EU method; ca 43.4 mpg US with US method) or a 1.4 L four cylinder diesel engine which has a fuel economy of 68.9 mpg (UK gallons EU method; 4.1 L/100 km EU method; ca 48.8 mpg US with US method). According to the German magazine Der Spiegel, the C1 is the production car with the second-best fuel economy both among petrol engines (after the Toyota Prius) and among diesel engines (after the Smart Fortwo mhd).

In January 2010, PSA Peugeot Citroën announced that it was recalling around 100,000 of the C1 and Peugeot 107, following the worldwide recall by Toyota for a sticking accelerator pedal – which the Aygo is affected by. Under certain circumstances, the pedal can stick in a partially depressed position, or return slowly to the off position. The C1 became popular as a cheap racing car for use in endurance racing, similar to its predecessor the Citroën 2CV.

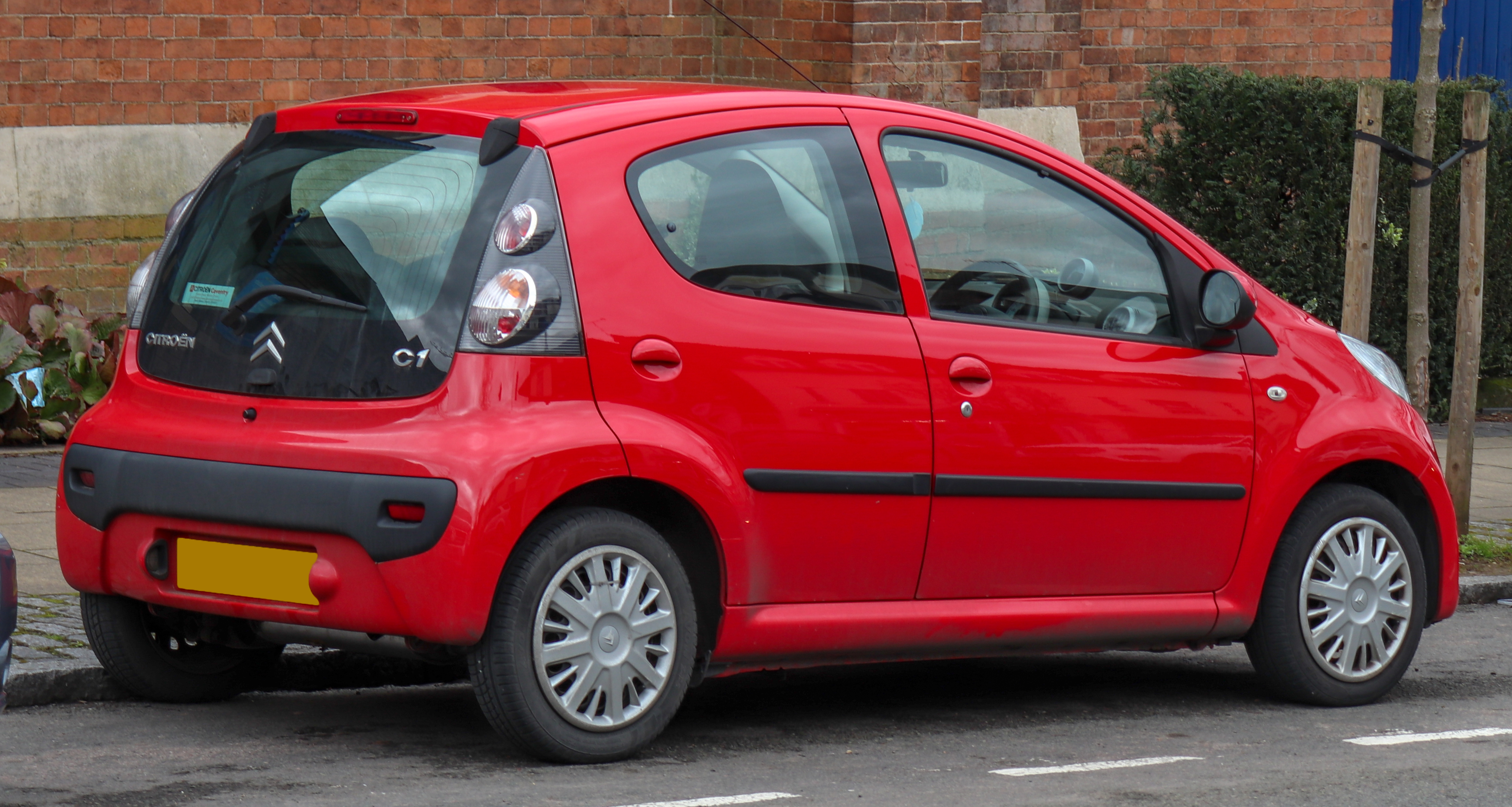
Rear view (pre-facelift)

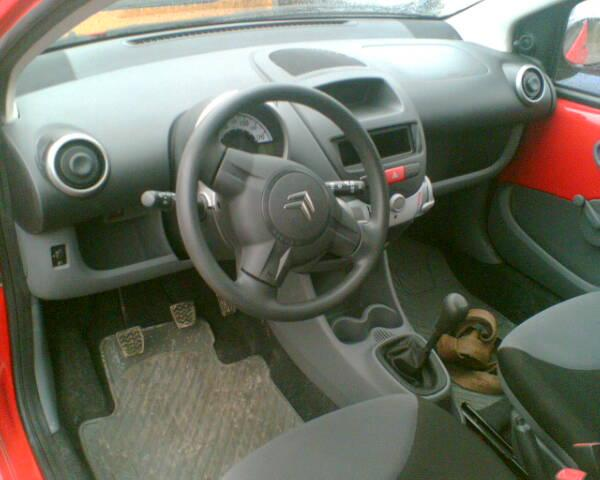
Interior (facelift)

=== Trim range (United Kingdom) ===
- Vibe, available in three-door or five-door, this was the basic model and the cheapest. Did not come with central locking, a rev counter, air conditioning or electric windows. Only available with the 1.0i engine.
- Rhythm, available in three-door or five-door, this trim added remote central locking, body-coloured wing mirrors, two side airbags and an engine rev counter. The 1.4 HDi diesel and the 1.0i petrol engines were both available with this trim.
- Code, available in three-door or five-door, added to the Rhythm specification by including 14 inch alloy wheels, half leather-trimmed seats, chrome interior trim inserts and a glove box cover. The 1.4 HDi diesel and the 1.0i petrol engines were both available with this trim.

Special editions (United Kingdom)

- Cool – based on the Vibe, adding air conditioning and blue seat fabrics/dashboard inserts, available in Lipizan White or Damas Blue.
- Airplay – based on the Rhythm, adding full iPod connectivity, iPod cradle, a 4 GB iPod Nano and coloured dashboard inserts and door pulls. Early models were available with bright, swirling decals. This model was originally revealed at the 2006 British International Motor Show in July 2006.

Designer Franco Sbarro created a modified C1 named the GT-C1, a design concept that follows the same theme of his previous Citroën Xsara Picasso Cup Concept. The extreme bodywork feature very wide wheels and gullwing doors alongside a modified 1.6L engine from the Citroën C2 VTS and Citroën C4 WRC-derived brakes.

In Portugal and Greece, a commercial van version called the Entreprise is offered, equipped with the 1.4L diesel engine and available only in the three-door body, for urban use. Its 107 sibling also offers an identical version.

In the United Kingdom, the now-defunct Electric Car Corporation sold an electric car based on the C1, called the Citroën C1 ev'ie from 2009 to 2012.

=== 2009 facelift ===
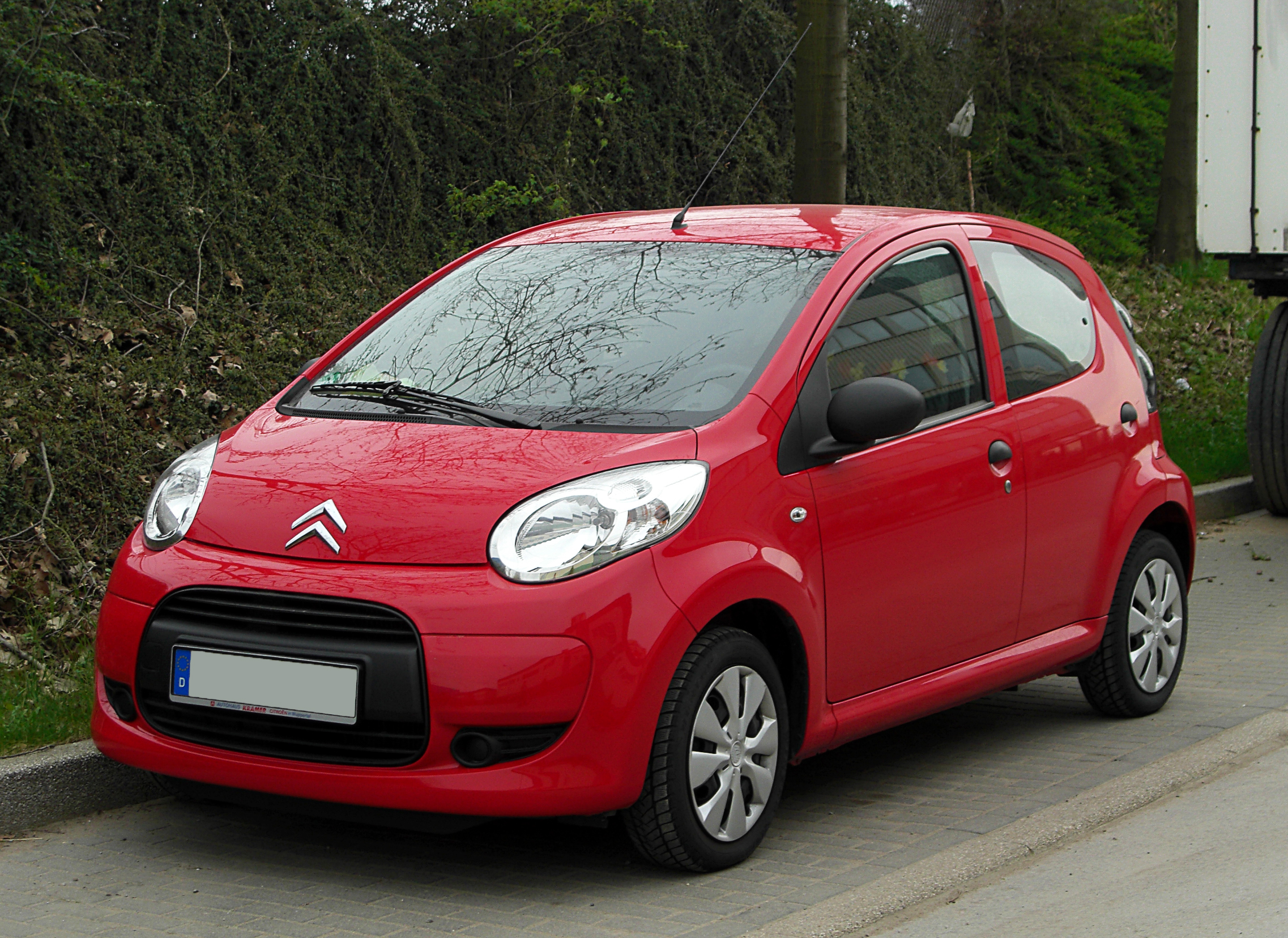
Facelift (2009)

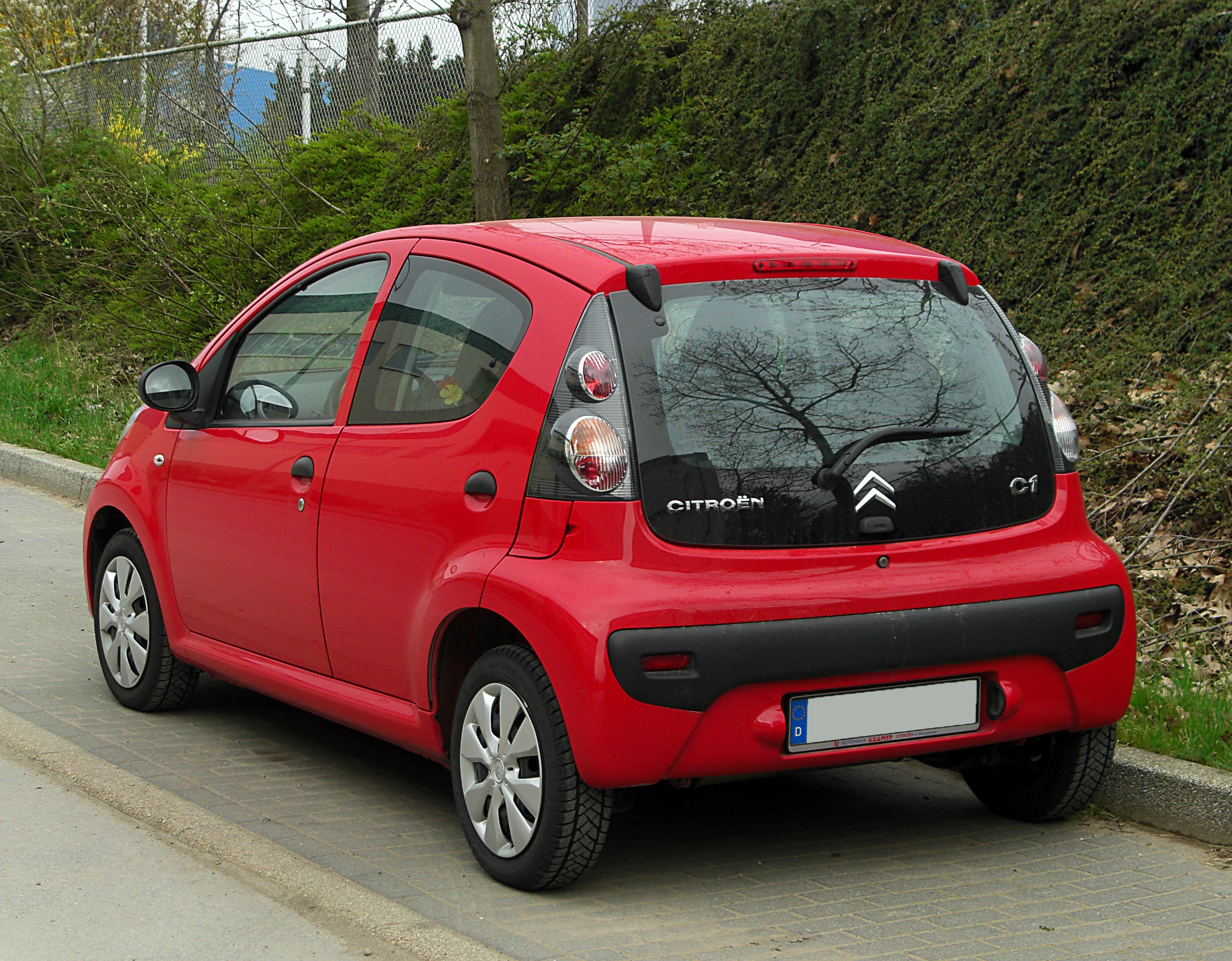
Facelift (2009) Citroën C1 showing tail light clusters

In January 2009, the Citroën C1 was facelifted at the same time as the Peugeot 107 and Toyota Aygo.

The updated C1 features a revised front bumper and grille, in keeping with Citroën's family look. Three new colours were also added and trim levels were also revised: basic Vibe models became 'VT', and Rhythm became 'VTR'. More durable seat fabrics were used and ventilation control graphics were updated for better legibility, and all models received new wheel trims. A revised clutch was fitted from this model onwards.

A special edition "Splash" was available at launch, though this was a strictly limited edition. This was based on the basic "VT". However, it featured air conditioning, a CD player and electric front windows. The Splash model was available in Electra Blue or Lipizan White. Electra Blue came with white door mirrors, whilst Lipizan White came with glossy black door mirrors.

=== 2012 facelift ===
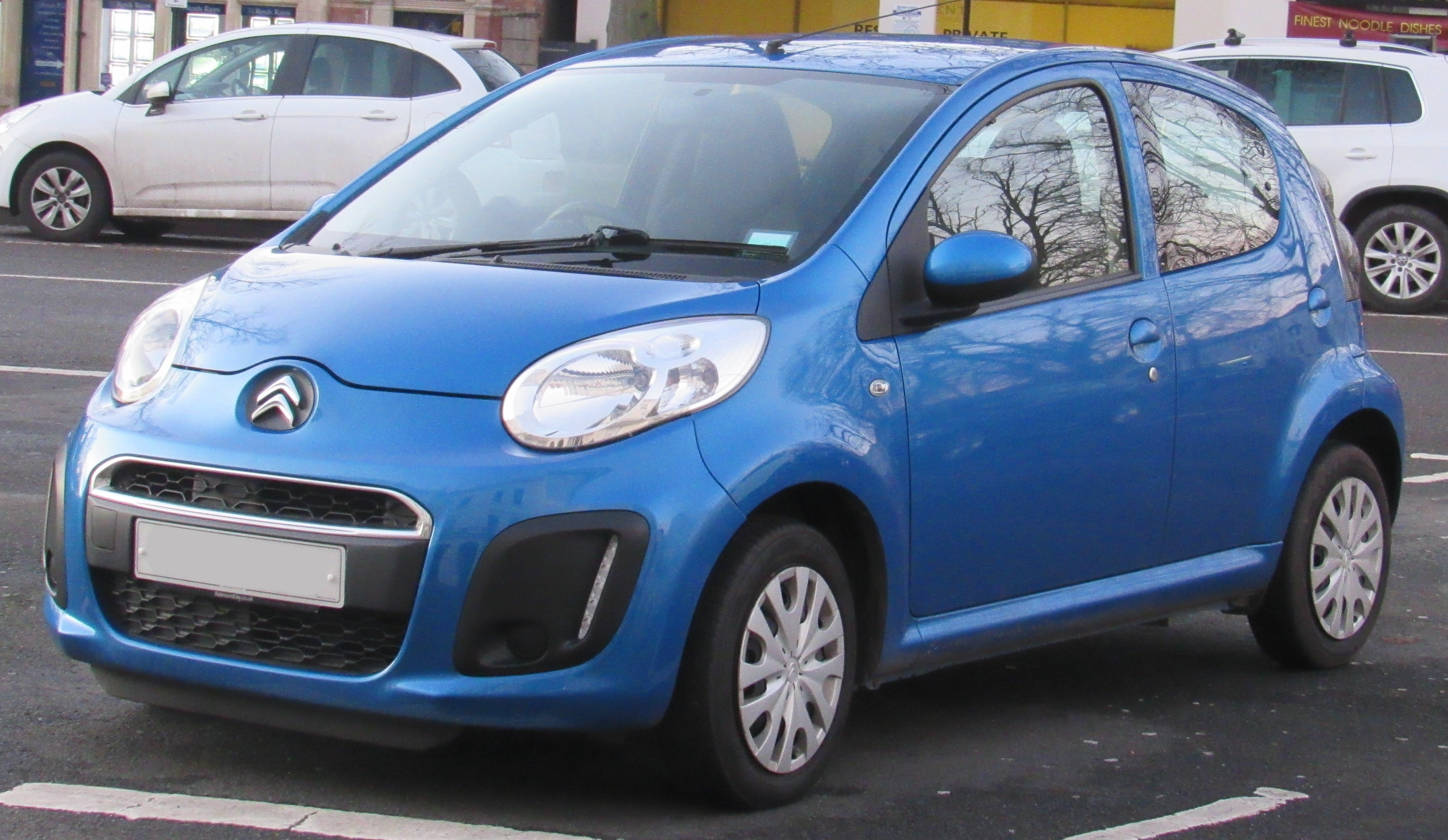
Facelift (2012)

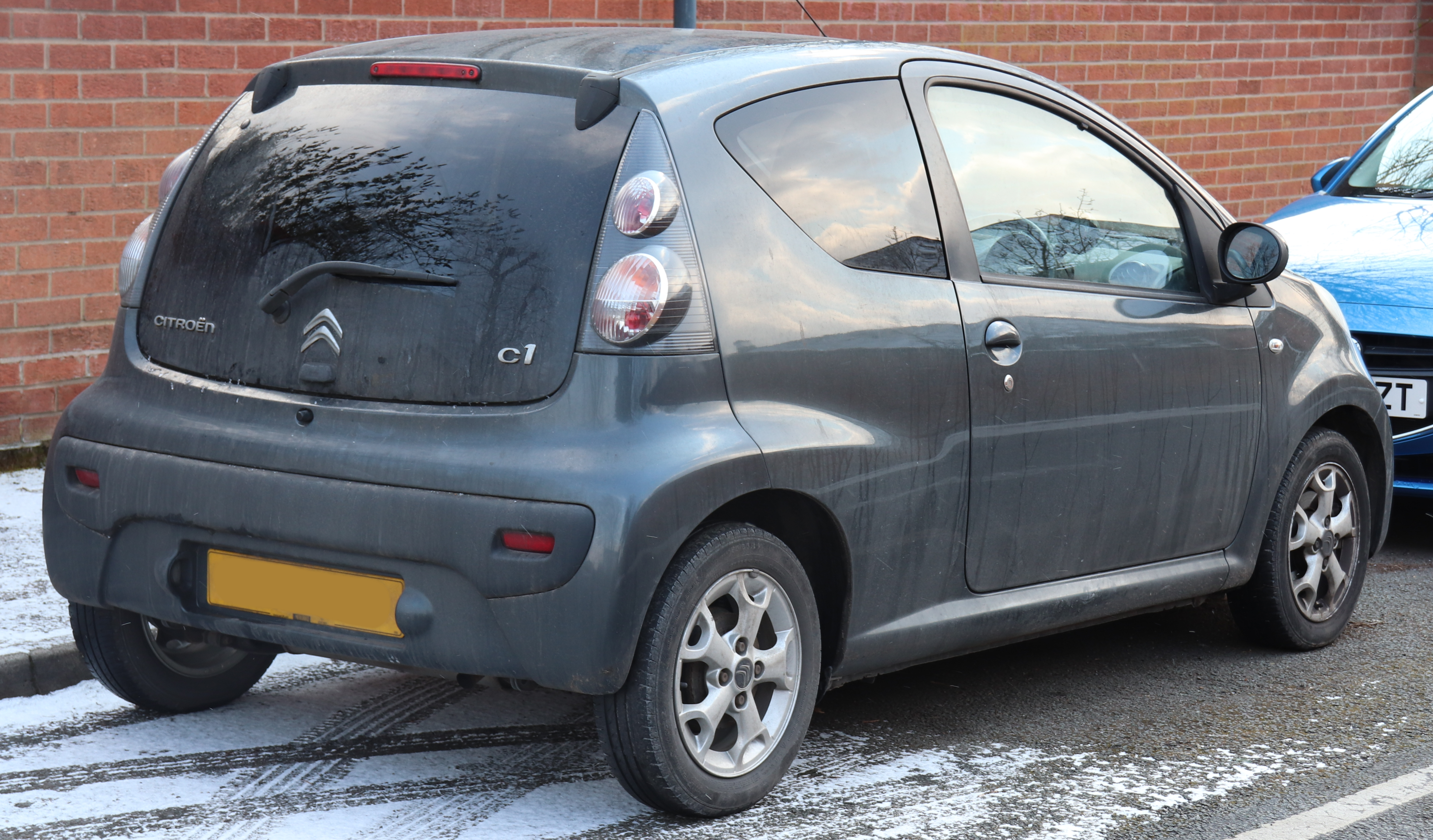
Facelift (2012) Citroën C1 showing tail light clusters

Citroën made a further facelift in March 2012. Changes included revised bumper, bonnet, steering wheel and CD player; LED daytime running lights, a new blue paint "Botticelli Blue", and improved fuel economy.

Two new trims were added to the facelift C1 range – Platinum and Edition, both came with alloy wheels, foglights, and a leather steering wheel and gearstick as standard while Platinum added a spoiler and chrome interior trim. VTR+ became the entry level trim when these were introduced.

In August 2012, a third trim, Connexion, was also added to the line-up. Connexion was based on the VTR trim, with 14" alloy wheels, dark tinted rear windows, and different painting.

From 2012 to 2014, The car was rebranded as the Citroën C1 eco for the Greek market.

=== Engines ===
Petrol engine
| Model | Year | Engine | Displacement | Power | Torque | 0–100 km/h (0–62 mph) | Top speed | Fuel economy (NEDC) | CO_{2} emission (g/km) |
|---|---|---|---|---|---|---|---|---|---|
| 1.0i 12V | 2005–2014 | I3 | 998 cc | 69 PS (51 kW; 68 hp) at 6,000 rpm | 93 N⋅m (69 lbf⋅ft) at 3,600 rpm | 13.7 s | 158 km/h (98 mph) | 4.3 L/100 km (66 mpg_{‑imp}; 55 mpg_{‑US}) | 99–109 |

Diesel engine
| Model | Year | Engine | Displacement | Power | Torque | 0–100 km/h (0–62 mph) | Top speed | Fuel economy (NEDC) | CO_{2} emission (g/km) |
|---|---|---|---|---|---|---|---|---|---|
| 1.4 HDi 8V | 2005–2010 | I4 | 1398 cc | 56 PS (41 kW; 55 hp) at 4,000 rpm | 130 N⋅m (96 lbf⋅ft) at 1,750 rpm | 15.6 s | 154 km/h (96 mph) | 4.0 L/100 km (71 mpg_{‑imp}; 59 mpg_{‑US}) | 109 |

=== Reliability ===
Breakdown statistics reported by the German Automobile Club in May 2010 placed the Citroën C1 (which the data grouped with the Peugeot 107 and Toyota Aygo) at the top of the sub small car class, in respect of the low breakdown rates achieved for cars aged between one and four years.

=== Safety ===
Euro NCAP test results* Citroën C1 1.0 5 door LHD hatchback (2005)
| Test | Score | Rating |
|---|---|---|
| Adult occupant: | 26 | 4 /5 stars |
| Child occupant: | 37 | 4 /5 stars |
| Pedestrian: | 14 | 2 /4 stars |

Euro NCAP test results* Citroën C1 1.0 5 door LHD hatchback (2012)
| Test | Points | % |
|---|---|---|
| Overall: | 3 /5 stars | |
| Adult occupant: | 24.6 | 68% |
| Child occupant: | 35.6 | 73% |
| Pedestrian: | 19.2 | 53% |
| Safety assist: | 5 | 71% |

The Euro NCAP score was reduced from 4 stars to 3 stars in the 2012 assessment, which used updated testing criteria that included safety-assistance systems.

== Second generation (AB40; 2014) ==
Second generation (AB40)
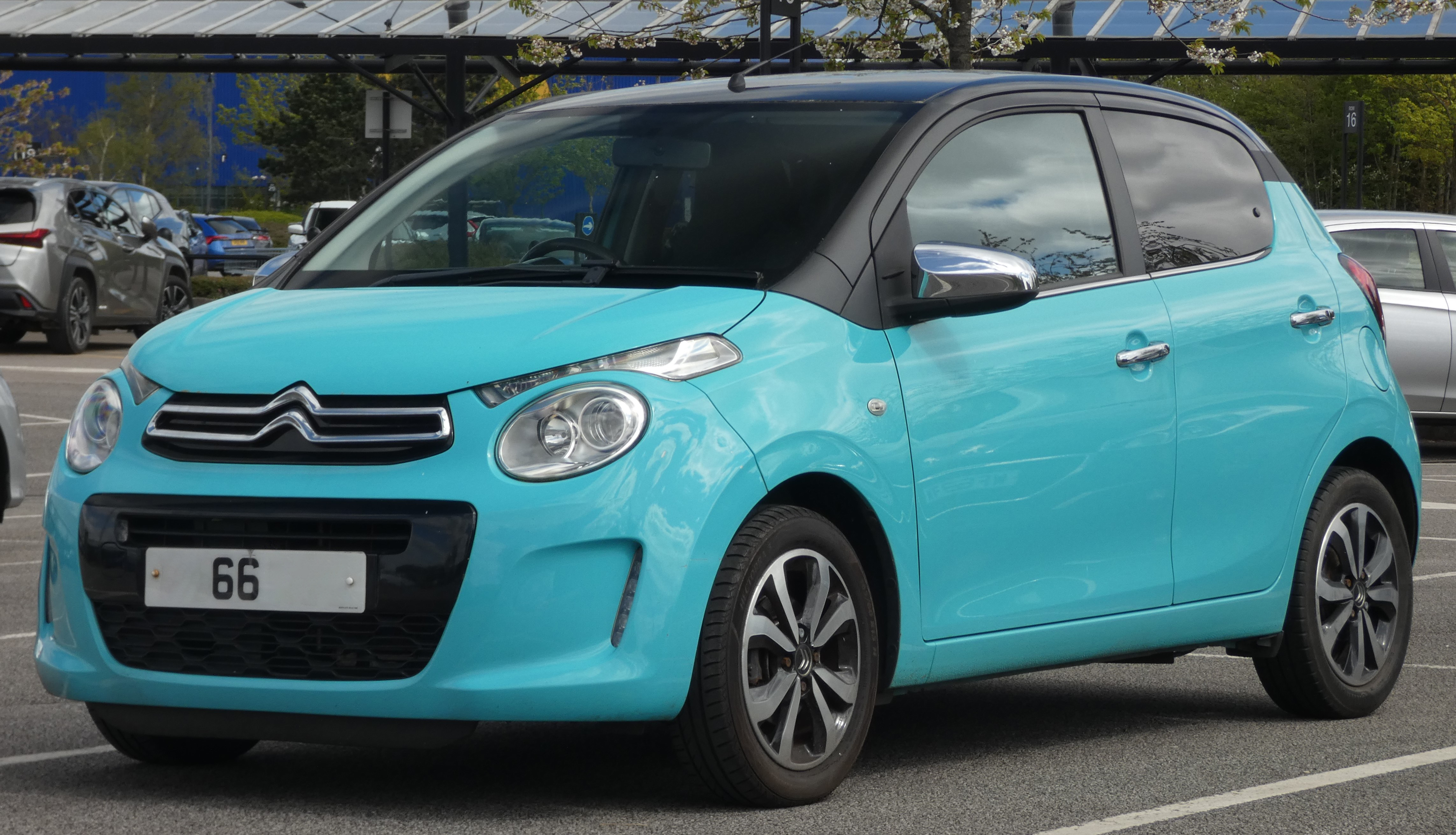
- 2017 Citroen C1 Flair

Overview
- Production: 2014 – January 2022

Body and chassis
- Body style: 3-door hatchback; 5-door hatchback; 5-door cabriolet
- Layout: Front-engine, front-wheel-drive

Powertrain
- Engine: 1.0 L Toyota 1KR-FE VTi I3 (petrol; KGB40) (2014-2018); 1.2 L EB2-F PureTech I3 (petrol; PAB40) (2014-2018); 1.0 L Toyota 1KR-B52 VTi I3 (petrol) (2018-2022)
- Transmission: 5-speed manual; 5-speed semi automatic (ETG5)

Dimensions
- Wheelbase: 2,340 mm (92.1 in)
- Length: 3,465 mm (136.4 in)
- Width: 1,615 mm (63.6 in)
- Height: 1,460 mm (57.5 in)
- Kerb weight: 840–956 kg (1,852–2,108 lb)

At the 2014 Geneva Motor Show, Citroën presented a redesigned C1, also to be manufactured at a factory of the Toyota Peugeot Citroën Automobile Czech (TPCA) in a joint venture with the Peugeot 108 and Toyota Aygo. A fixed-profile cabriolet model named Airscape was introduced with a folding canvas roof, available in both 3 and 5-door configurations.

=== Trim range ===
- Feel - Comes with large fabric sunroof, sacrificing some of the rear headroom. Replaced in 2020 by the 'Sense' trim.
- Flair - same as Feel trim, but also comes with optional keyless start, climate control, and a reversing camera. Replaced in 2020 with the 'Shine' trim.
- Sense
- Shine
- Touch - most basic trim level, lacking air conditioning, a rev counter, and adjustable driving seats.

Special editions

- Elle - cherry pink stitching and two tone paint.
- JCC+ - made in collaboration with French fashion designer, Jean-Charles de Castelbajac, the JCC+ is based upon the base flair model. The trim level has a number of customised features, including but a 15" black alloy wheels, different paint, unique badging, and automatic air conditioning and headlights.
- Lagoon
- Origins Collector's Edition - features a number of cosmetic changes plus 15" black alloy wheels.
- Furio - comes with a more 'sporty' look, such as race stripes, roof spoiler, and central exhaust tip.
- Sunrise
- Urban Ride - additional paint options.

=== Engines ===
Petrol engine
| Name | Year | Engine model | Displacement | Power | Torque | 0–100 km/h (0–62 mph) | Top speed | Fuel economy (NEDC) | CO_{2} emission (g/km) |
|---|---|---|---|---|---|---|---|---|---|
| 1.0 VTi 68 | 2014–2018 | 1.0 L 1KR-FE I3 | 998 cc | 69 PS (51 kW; 68 hp) at 6,000 rpm | 95 N⋅m (70 lbf⋅ft) at 4,300 rpm | 14.3 s (manual) 14.6 s (ETG) | 160 km/h (99 mph) | 4.1 L/100 km (69 mpg_{‑imp}; 57 mpg_{‑US}) | 90 |
| 1.2 PureTech | 2014–2018 | 1.2 L EB2-F I3 | 1199 cc | 83 PS (61 kW; 82 hp) at 5,750 rpm | 117 N⋅m (86 lbf⋅ft) at 2,750 rpm | 11.0 s | 171 km/h (106 mph) | 4.3 L/100 km (66 mpg_{‑imp}; 55 mpg_{‑US}) | 99 |
| 1.0 VTi 72 | 2019-2022 | 1.0 L 1KR-B52 I3 | 998 cc | 72 PS (53 kW; 71 hp) at 6,000 rpm | 93 N⋅m (69 lbf⋅ft) at 4,400 rpm | 14.0 s | 160 km/h (99 mph) | 3.8 L/100 km (74 mpg_{‑imp}; 62 mpg_{‑US}) | 86 |

=== Safety ===
Euro NCAP test results* Citroën C1 1.0 5 door LHD hatchback (2014)
| Test | Points | % |
|---|---|---|
| Overall: | 4 /5 stars | |
| Adult occupant: | 30.7 | 80% |
| Child occupant: | 39.5 | 80% |
| Pedestrian: | 22.5 | 62% |
| Safety assist: | 7.3 | 56% |

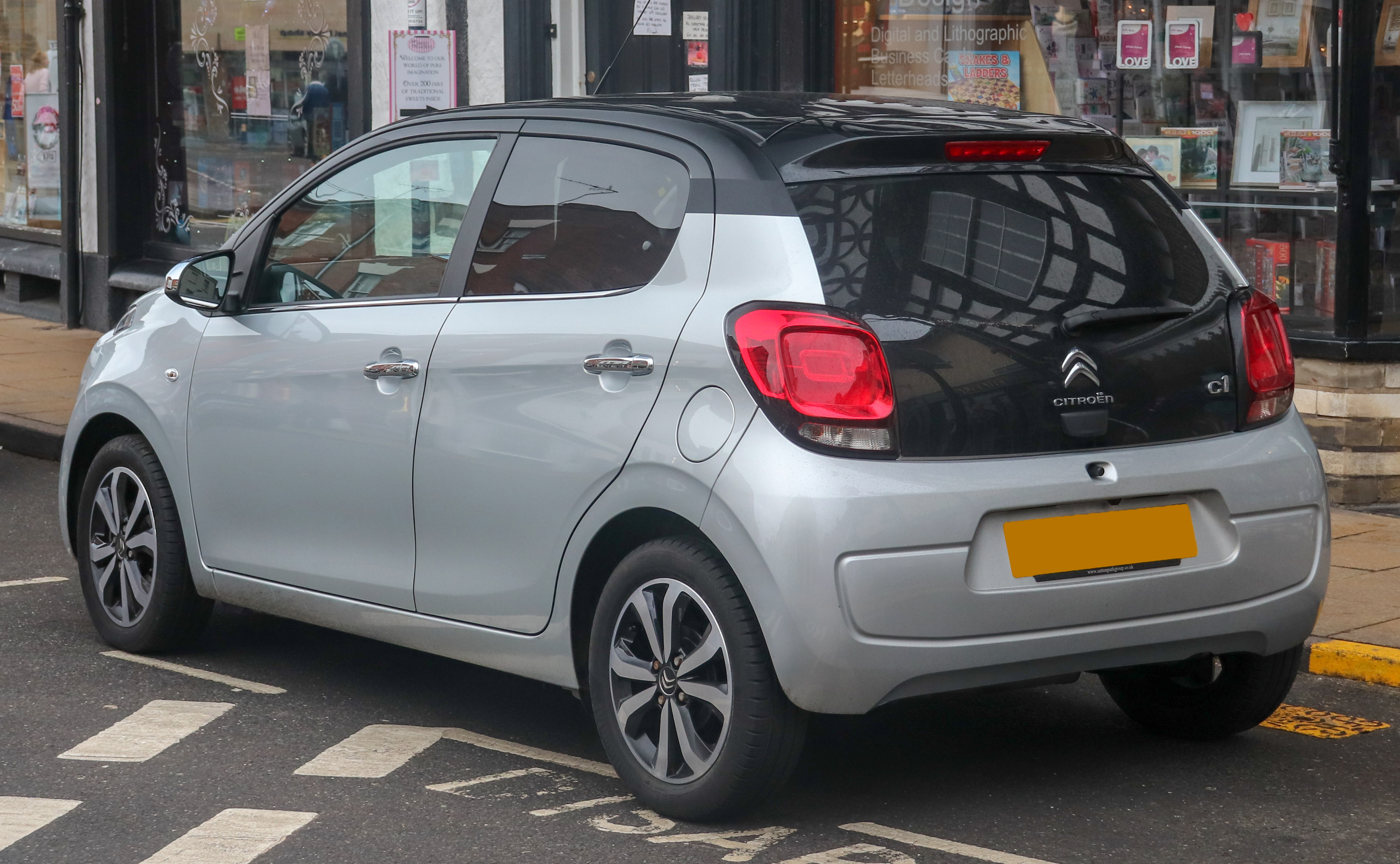
Rear view (Second generation; PAB40)

== Discontinuation ==
The next-generation C1 was planned to be released in March 2021 based on the TNGA-B platform, but the plan was cancelled. The TPCA joint venture announced the discontinuation of the Citroën C1 and Peugeot 108 for 2021, while the Toyota Aygo will continue to the third-generation as the Toyota Aygo X. Production was stopped on 1 January 2022, after almost 1.2 million vehicles were produced (both generations included).

== Sales ==
| Calendar Year | Europe |
|---|---|
| 2005 | 17,949 |
| 2006 | 87,563 |
| 2007 | 93,903 |
| 2008 | 104,475 |
| 2009 | 118,702 |
| 2010 | 102,023 |
| 2011 | 82,969 |
| 2012 | 65,573 |
| 2013 | 56,722 |
| 2014 | 53,518 |
| 2015 | 63,695 |
| 2016 | 62,537 |
| 2017 | 53,292 |
| 2018 | 52,020 |
| 2019 | 49,900 |
| 2020 | 40,578 |
| 2021 | 35,897 |
| 2022 | 3,559 |

== See also ==
- Citroën C1 ev'ie — an electric vehicle conversion of the C1
