= Toyota Motor Manufacturing Czech Republic =

Automobile manufacturing company

Coordinates: 50°4′16.75″N 15°13′54.79″E

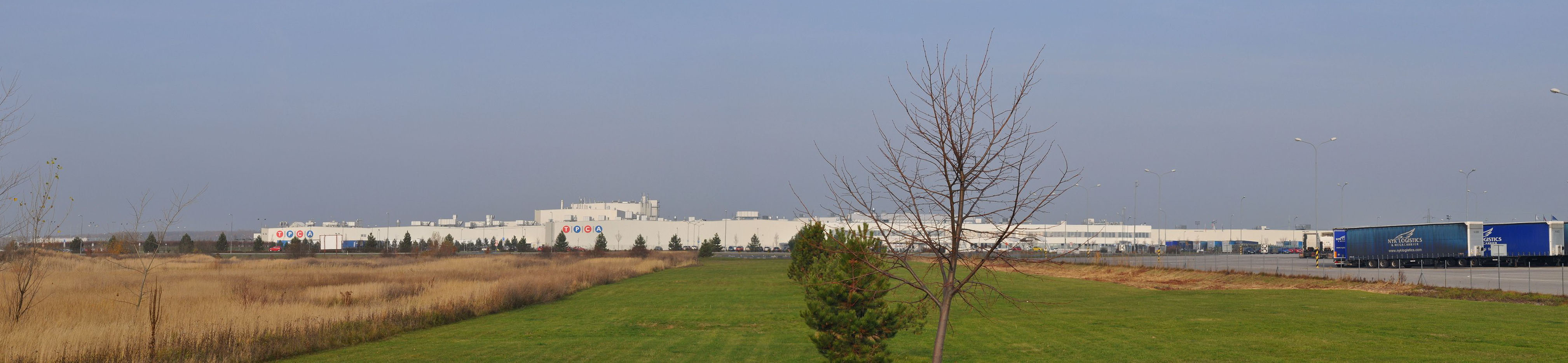
- Toyota Czech factory in 2013
- Formerly: Toyota Peugeot Citroën Automobile Czech (until 2021)
- Type: Subsidiary
- Industry: Automotive
- Founded: March 8, 2002; 24 years ago
- Headquarters: Kolín, Czech Republic
- Products: Automobiles
- Revenue: CZK 78.27 billion (2025–26)
- Operating income: CZK 882.5 million (2025–26)
- Net income: CZK 712.9 million (2025–26)
- Total assets: CZK 17.02 billion (31 March 2026)
- Total equity: CZK 5.85 billion (31 March 2026)
- Number of employees: 3,087 (2025–26 average)
- Parent: Toyota Motor Europe
- Website: www.toyotacz.com

Toyota Motor Manufacturing Czech Republic s.r.o., also known by its initials TMMCZ, is a Czech automobile manufacturer headquartered in Kolín, Czech Republic. It was originally established in 2002 by the Toyota Motor Corporation and the PSA Group (previously PSA Peugeot Citroën) as a 50:50 joint venture known as Toyota Peugeot Citroën Automobile Czech s.r.o. (TPCA) until 2021. On 1 January 2021, two years after announcement of the end of the joint venture in Europe, Toyota acquired the remaining 50% of PSA's interest in TPCA and adopted its present name.

== History ==
Logo of Toyota Peugeot Citroën Automobile Czech

TPCA was established in March 2002 and production started in February 2005.

In November 2018, PSA and Toyota announced the end of their joint venture in Europe. On 1 January 2021, the plant became a wholly owned subsidiary of Toyota Motor Europe and was renamed as Toyota Motor Manufacturing Czech Republic, making it its 8th plant in Europe.

=== Hybrid and electric vehicle production ===
Aygo X production started in March 2022. Its hybrid version replaced the petrol-only model in November 2025, and the factory has since produced only hybrids.

In September 2025, Toyota announced a €680 million investment to expand the Kolín factory for electric vehicle production. The plans include new paint and welding shops and a battery assembly facility. Toyota plans to build hybrids and electric cars on the same assembly line.

Electric car production is expected to begin in 2028, according to Toyota Italia chief executive Alberto Santilli.

== Products ==
The company originally produced three cars that were, in essence, the same but badge engineered: the Citroën C1, Peugeot 107 and Toyota Aygo. These cars shared the vast majority of parts with only small cosmetic alterations. The project was called B-Zero after its city car market segment.

In 2014, the new generation models were launched, with Citroën and Toyota retaining their existing model names, and Peugeot naming their new version the 108. The second generation joint venture still shares many key components, but there are more visual differences between the different marques.

=== Current products ===
- Toyota Aygo X (2022–present)
- Toyota Yaris (XP210) (2021–present)

=== Former products ===
- Citroën C1 (2005–2021)
- Peugeot 107 (2005–2014)
- Peugeot 108 (2014–2021)
- Toyota Aygo (2005–2021)

== 2010 recall ==
In January 2010, Toyota announced a worldwide recall on several of their vehicles for a faulty sticking accelerator pedal - in which the Aygo is affected. Under certain circumstances, the pedal can stick in a partially depressed position, or return slowly to the off position. PSA Peugeot Citroën followed suit, announcing a recall of "under 100,000 units" of the Citroën C1 and the Peugeot 107 for the same issue. New information from Toyota has suggested, however, that only Aygos and Peugeot 107s with Aisin Ez-drive automated manual gearboxes (Multi-mode/2-Tronic) are affected, and that those with manual gearboxes are not.

== Production ==
Year	Vehicles produced
2015	219,054
2016	220,611
2017	199,078
2018	210,993
2019	210,121
2020	164,572
2021	149,936
2022	202,255
2023	192,427
2024	225,058
2025	222,461

Production by model, 2025
Model / variant	Vehicles produced
Toyota Yaris	118,403
Toyota Aygo X (petrol)	91,073
Toyota Aygo X (hybrid)	12,985
Total	222,461

Production of former models
Model	Production period	Vehicles produced
Toyota Aygo	2005–2021	1,465,872
Citroën C1	2005–2021	1,185,407
Peugeot 107	2005–2014	819,054
Peugeot 108	2014–2021	428,070

== Logistics ==
On 8 November 2024, Toyota Motor Europe opened a vehicle distribution centre at the Kolín factory, following an investment of €17 million. The centre can process up to 350,000 vehicles a year and serves Toyota and Lexus dealers in Czechia, Germany, Austria, Poland, Slovakia and Hungary.
