= Peugeot 107 =

City car

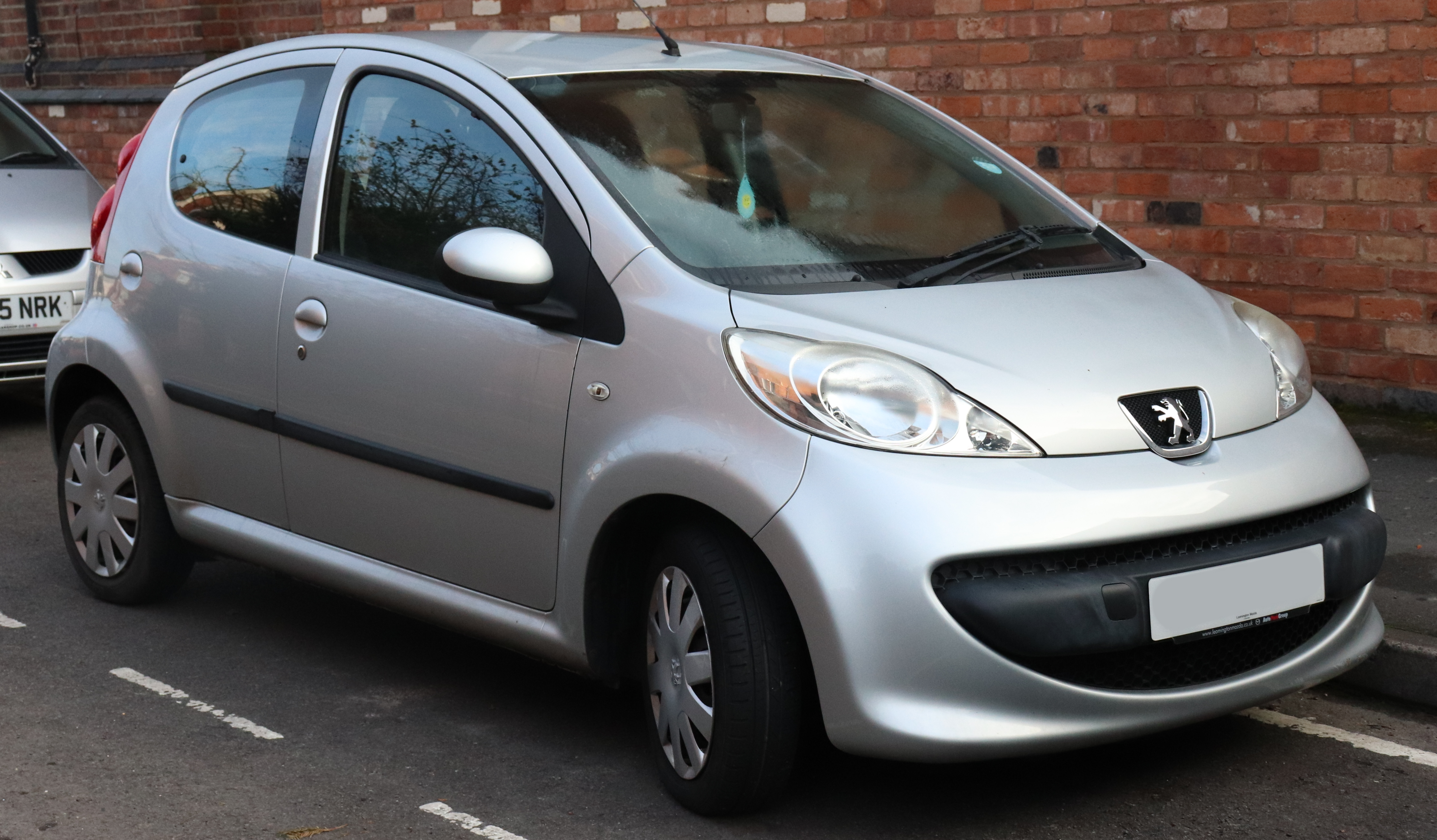
- Pre-facelift Peugeot 107 (2007)

Overview
- Manufacturer: TPCA
- Production: June 2005 – 2014
- Assembly: Czech Republic: Kolín (TPCA)
- Designer: Donato Coco

Body and chassis
- Class: City car (A)
- Body style: 3-door hatchback 5-door hatchback
- Layout: Front-engine, front-wheel-drive
- Related: Citroën C1; Toyota Aygo

Powertrain
- Engine: Petrol: 1.0 L Toyota 1KR-FE VTi I3 12V; Diesel: 1.4 L DV4-TD HDi I4 8V
- Transmission: 5-speed manual 5-speed automated manual (2-Tronic, Auto5R)

Dimensions
- Wheelbase: 2,340 mm (92.1 in)
- Length: 3,430 mm (135.0 in)
- Width: 1,630 mm (64.2 in)
- Height: 1,470 mm (57.9 in)
- Curb weight: 790–880 kg (1,742–1,940 lb)

Chronology
- Predecessor: Peugeot 106; Peugeot 1007
- Successor: Peugeot 108

The Peugeot 107 is a city car produced by French automaker Peugeot, launched in June 2005, and produced until 2014.

The 107 was developed by the B-Zero project of PSA Peugeot Citroën in a joint venture with Toyota; the Citroën C1 and Toyota Aygo are badge engineered variants of each other, the Aygo having more detail differences from the C1 and 107. The three were manufactured at the TPCA assembly joint venture in Kolín, Czech Republic.

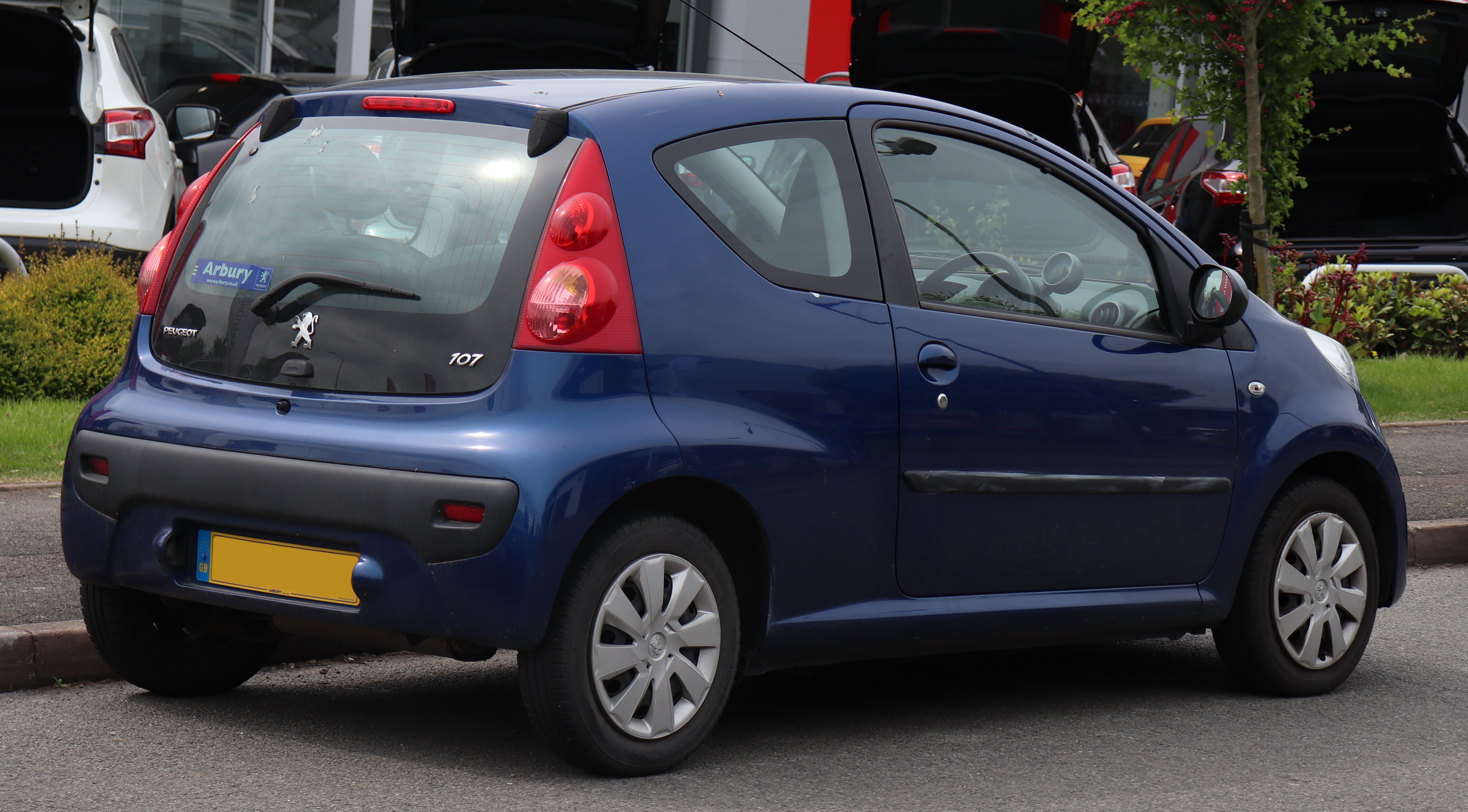
Rear View

The 107 is a four-seater available as a three or five-door hatchback, replacing the 106, which ended production in July 2003. It shares its rear tail light clusters with the Citroën C1, apart from a different red coloured lens.

== Engines ==
Petrol engine
Model	Year	Engine	Displacement	Power	Torque	0–100 km/h (0–62 mph)	Top speed	Fuel economy (NEDC)	CO_{2} emission (g/km)
1.0i 12V	2005–2014	I3	998 cc	69 PS (51 kW; 68 hp) at 6,000 rpm	93 N⋅m (69 lbf⋅ft) at 3,600 rpm	12.3 s	158 km/h (98 mph)	4.3 L/100 km (66 mpg_{‑imp}; 55 mpg_{‑US})	99-109

Diesel engine
Model	Year	Engine	Displacement	Power	Torque	0–100 km/h (0–62 mph)	Top speed	Fuel economy (NEDC)	CO_{2} emission (g/km)
1.4 HDi 8V	2005–2010	I4	1398 cc	56 PS (41 kW; 55 hp) at 4,000 rpm	130 N⋅m (96 lbf⋅ft) at 1,750 rpm	14.8 s	154 km/h (96 mph)	4.0 L/100 km (71 mpg_{‑imp}; 59 mpg_{‑US})	109

== Facelifts ==
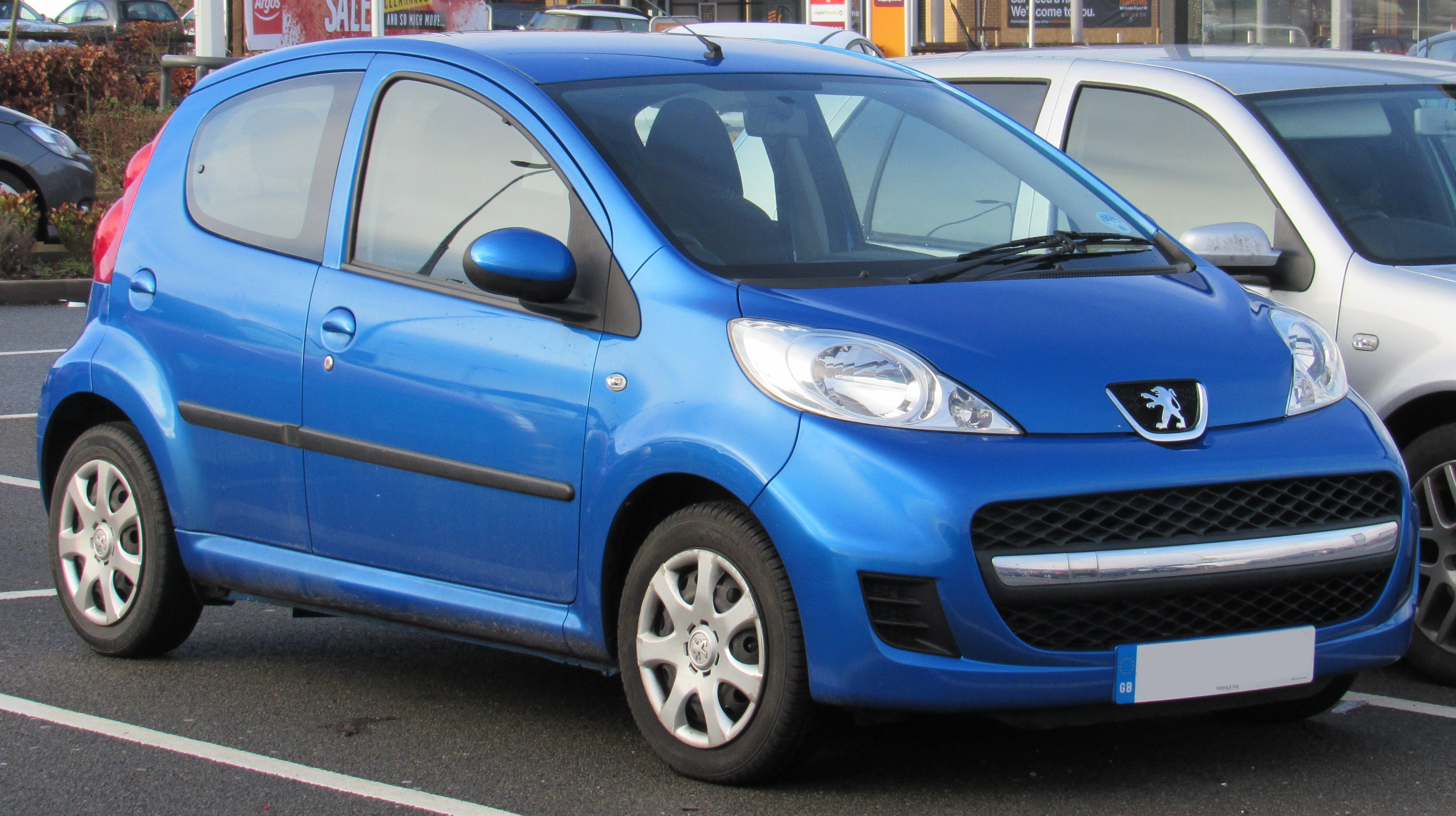
Facelifted Peugeot 107 (2009)

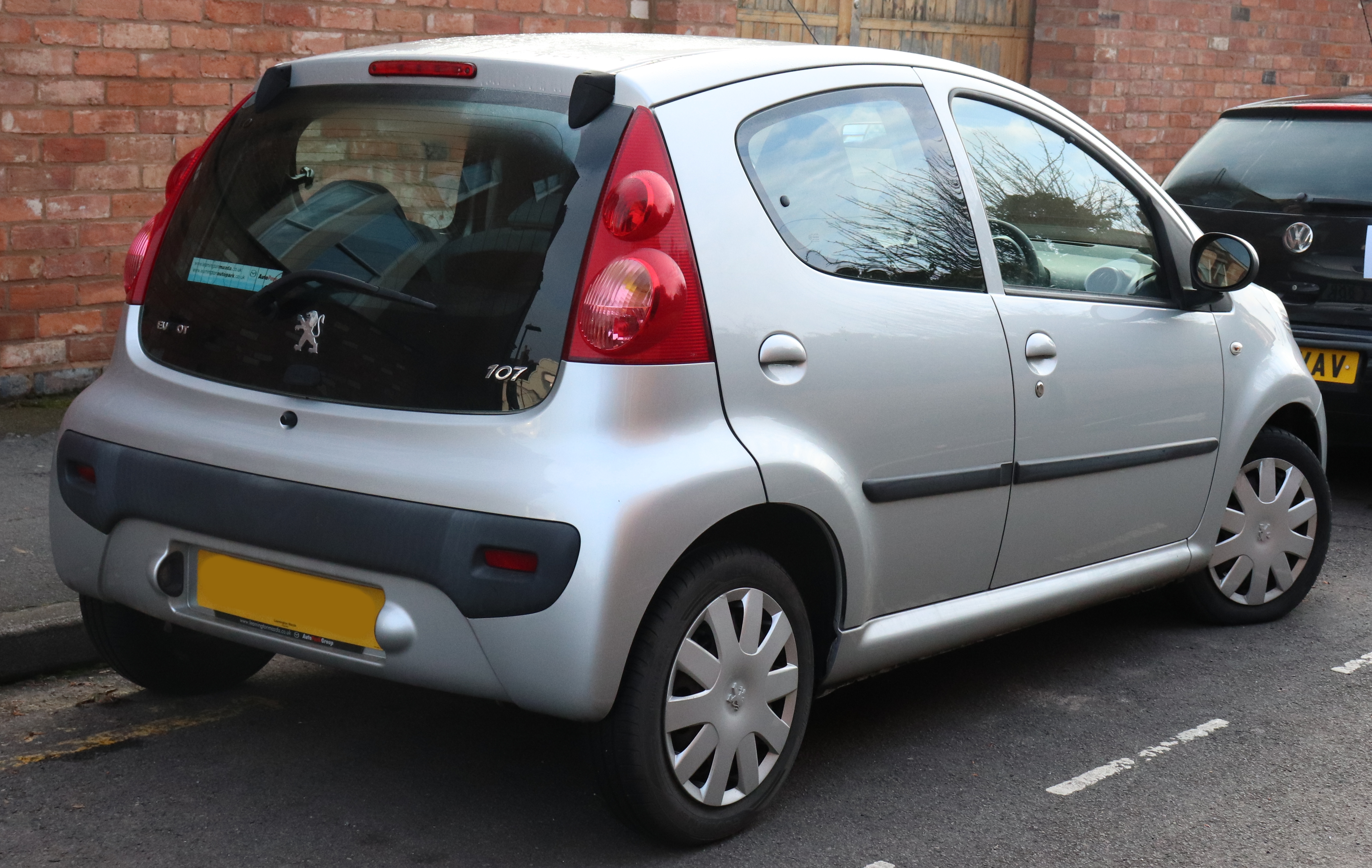
Peugeot 107 (rear)

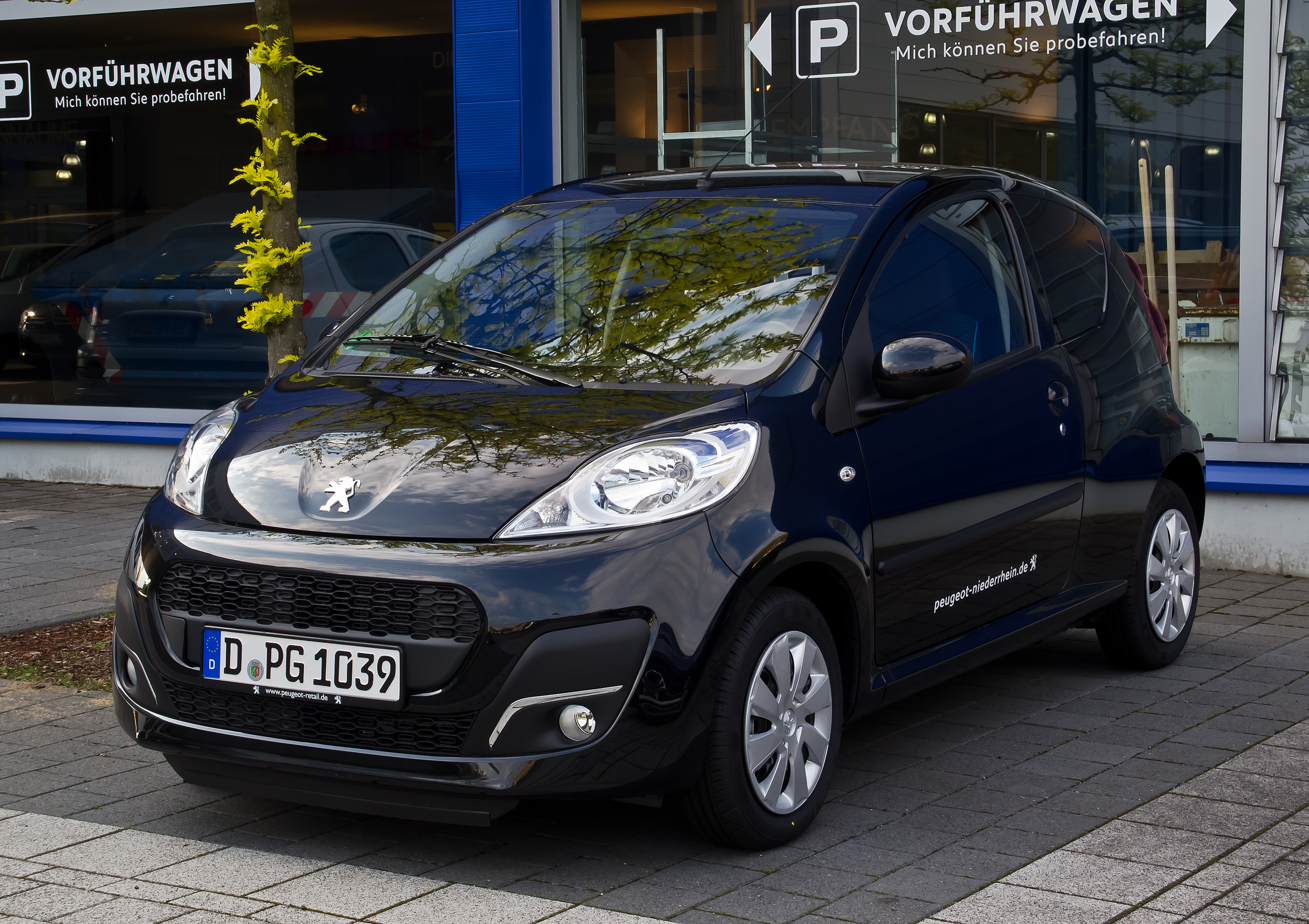
Facelifted Peugeot 107 (2012)

In February 2009, the Peugeot 107 received a facelift aligned with revisions to the Citroën C1 and the Toyota Aygo. Aesthetic changes included revised front bumper, interior, and wheel trims. The front fascia received a wider grille.

The placement of the number plate has been moved from the black stripe in the middle of the grille (which now has a chrome style strip running along with it) to underneath the grille itself and two side vents have been added to give the car an updated look. The interior offered more seat fabric choices and revised centre console graphics. The engine now produces 106 grams of carbon dioxide per kilometre opposed to 109 before and the Standard Combined Urban Cycle fuel economy has been improved from 61 mpg_{‑imp} (4.6 L/100 km; 51 mpg_{‑US}) to 62.8 mpg_{‑imp} (4.50 L/100 km; 52.3 mpg_{‑US}). A revised clutch was fitted from this model onwards.

In the beginning of 2012, the 107 received a further facelift with a revised bonnet and front bumper/grille with integrated daytime running lights. The interior received a leather steering wheel and a new gearshift on higher-level trims. The official premiere of the facelift was in the Brussels Motor Show.

=== Trim levels ===
There were a total of 15 trim levels or the Peugeot 107. These include:

- Access - basic, entry-level trim.
- Active - steel wheels, traction control, folding rear seats, and front fog lights. Also includes electric front windows, air conditioning, and remote central locking.
- Allure - top end model, with partial leather seating, steel wheels, and front fog lights. Also comes with bluetooth and daytime running lights.
- Envy - top end model, with a leather trim on the seats and steering wheel, air conditioning, and fog lights.
- Kiss - special edition, launched in collaboration with Kiss radio. Features include a special paint job, USB port, upgraded radio, and its own sound system.
- Millesim - special edition, based on the Urban Plus trim.
- Sport XS - comes with a number of 'sporty' cosmetic changes.
- Sportium - comes with a number of cosmetic changes, including dark tinted windows, 14" alloy wheels, and new colours.
- Urban - similar to the Citroën C1 Rhythm trim, but without a rev counter or air conditioning.
- Urban Lite - a lower spec model of the Urban trim.
- Urban Move - special edition, based on the Urban trim. Includes air conditioning, a rev counter, and some cosmetic changes.
- Urban Plus
- Verve
- XE Lite

== Reliability ==
Breakdown statistics reported by the German Automobile Club in May 2010 placed the Peugeot 107 (of which the data were grouped with those of the Citroën C1 and Toyota Aygo) at the top of the sub small car class, in respect of the low breakdown rates achieved for cars aged between 1 and 4 years. Class laggards were the Chevrolet Matiz (0–3 year old cars) and the two seater Smart (4–5 year old cars).

In January 2010, PSA announced that it was recalling "under 100,000 units" of the 107 and the Citroën C1, following the worldwide recall by Toyota for a faulty sticking accelerator pedal – which the Aygo is affected by. Under certain circumstances, the pedal can stick in a partially depressed position, or return slowly to the off position.

=== Safety ===
Euro NCAP test results Citroen C1 1.0 five door LHD hatchback (2005)
Test	Score	Rating
Adult occupant:	26	4 /5 stars
Child occupant:	37	4 /5 stars
Pedestrian:	14	2 /4 stars

Euro NCAP test results Toyota Aygo 1.0 High Grade, LHD (2012)
Test	Points	%
Overall:	3 /5 stars	
Adult occupant:	25	68%
Child occupant:	36	73%
Pedestrian:	19	53%
Safety assist:	5	71%

== Replacement ==
The 107 was replaced by the Peugeot 108, which was launched in July 2014.

== Sales ==
Calendar Year	Europe
2005	19,610
2006	91,025
2007	97,225
2008	98,236
2009	117,920
2010	106,408
2011	85,858
2012	69,238
2013	55,244
2014	24,356
2015	88
2016	5
2017	1
2018	2
