= Toyota Aygo X =

Crossover city car

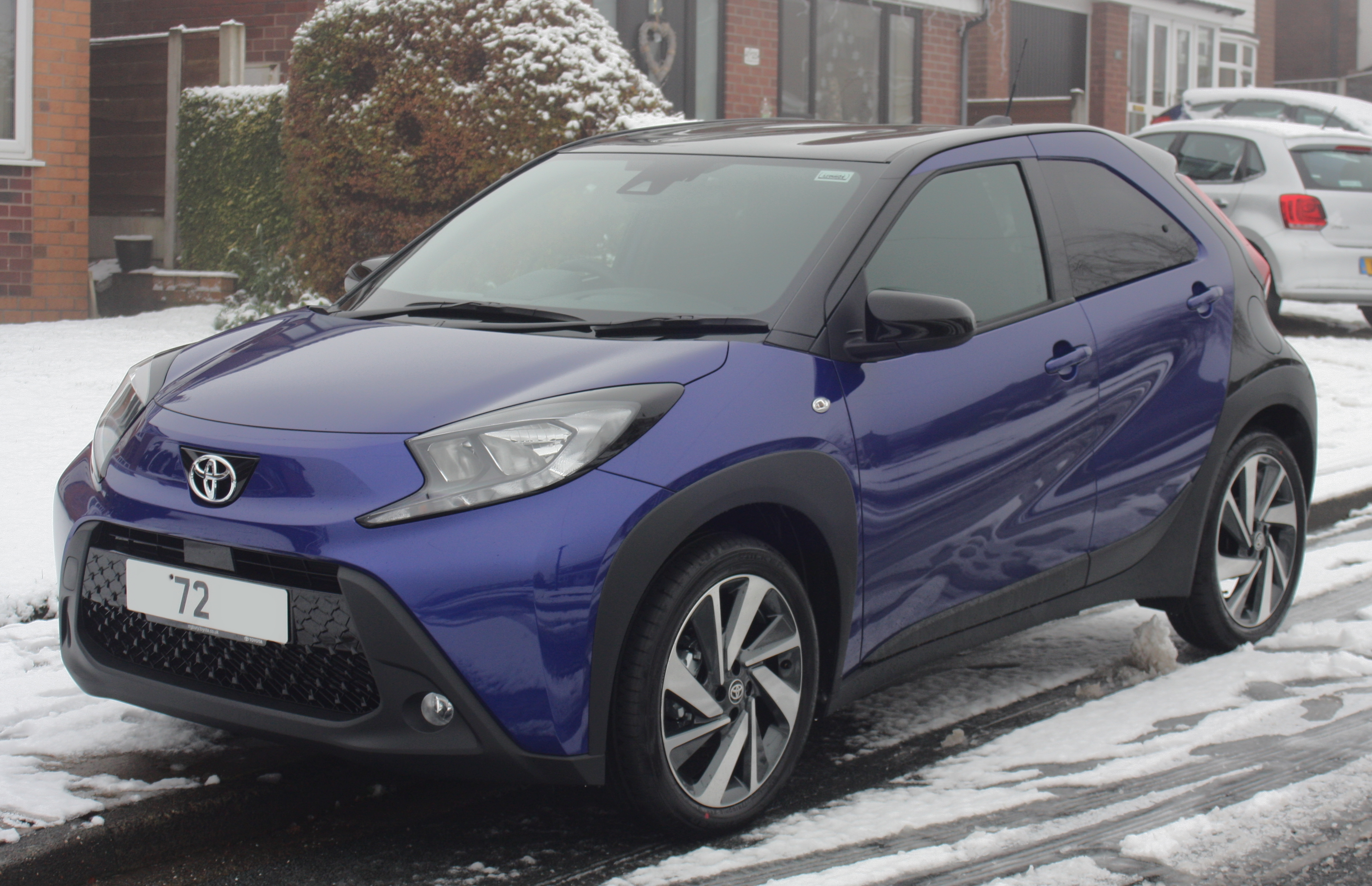
- 2022 Toyota Aygo X Edge (KGB70)

Overview
- Manufacturer: Toyota
- Model code: AB70
- Production: March 2022 – present
- Assembly: Czech Republic: Kolín (TMMCZ)
- Designer: Noriyuki Nakamura

Body and chassis
- Class: Crossover city car (A)
- Body style: 5-door SUV
- Layout: Front-engine, front-wheel-drive
- Platform: TNGA: GA-B
- Related: Toyota Yaris (XP210)

Powertrain
- Engine: Petrol: 998 cc 1KR-B52 I3 (KGB70) (2022–2025); Petrol hybrid: 1490 cc M15A-FXE I3 (MABH70) (2025–present)
- Power output: 54 kW (72 hp; 73 PS) (1.0 L); 85 kW (114 hp; 116 PS) (1.5 L hybrid, combined system output)
- Transmission: 5-speed C554 manual (2022–2025); 773K CVT (2022–2025); eCVT (2025–present)
- Hybrid drivetrain: Power-split

Dimensions
- Wheelbase: 2,430 mm (95.7 in)
- Length: 3,700 mm (145.7 in)
- Width: 1,740 mm (68.5 in)
- Height: 1,525 mm (60.0 in)
- Kerb weight: 940–1,015 kg (2,072–2,238 lb)

Chronology
- Predecessor: Toyota Aygo

The Toyota Aygo X (pronounced Aygo Cross) is a crossover city car (A-segment) produced by Toyota since 2022. Using the Aygo nameplate, it is primarily marketed for the European market. It is built at the Toyota Motor Manufacturing Czech Republic (TMMCZ, formerly known as TPCA) plant in Kolín, Czech Republic, and replaces the previous Aygo hatchback produced in two generations from 2005 to 2022. As of 2024, the Aygo X is the smallest crossover SUV model form Toyota, positioned below the larger Yaris Cross (XP210).

== Overview ==
With increasingly stringent safety and emissions requirements in Europe, A-segment cars became more expensive to develop and produce, resulting in dwindling sales. Amidst these market circumstances, PSA Group ended its joint venture with Toyota in producing small city cars. Toyota instead decided to develop an Aygo successor based on the B-segment Yaris platform.

The Aygo X was previewed by the "Aygo X prologue" concept car, which was presented on 17 March 2021. The concept car was designed by Toyota Motor Europe ED² design center in Sophia-Antipolis, France, while the production version was designed by Toyota Motor Europe design center of Zaventem, Belgium. The latter was presented on 5 November. The "X" is pronounced "Cross" to define the vehicle as a crossover, similar to the Yaris Cross and the Corolla Cross. The Aygo X is marketed as a higher-end vehicle in the A-segment class.

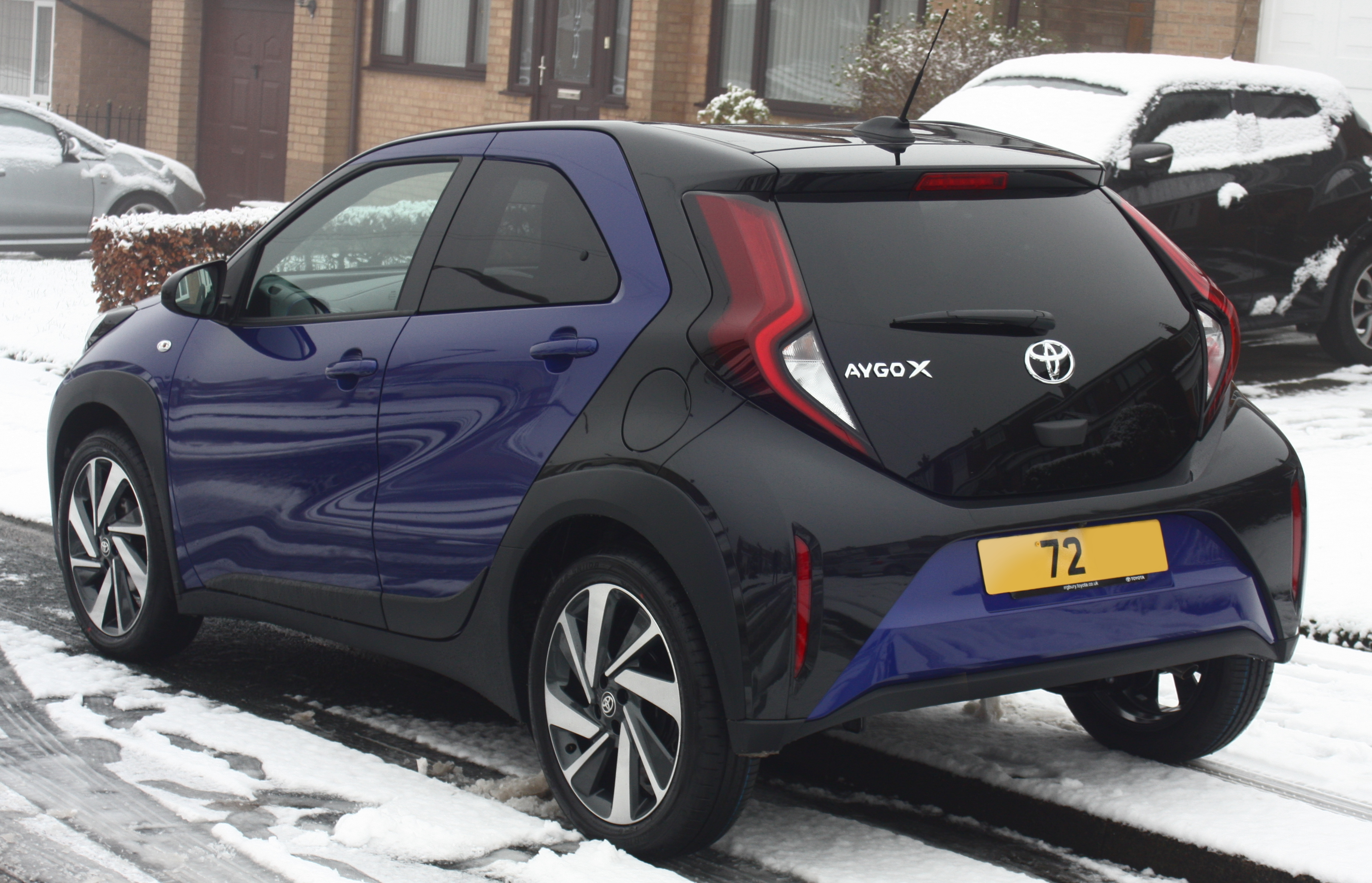
Rear view

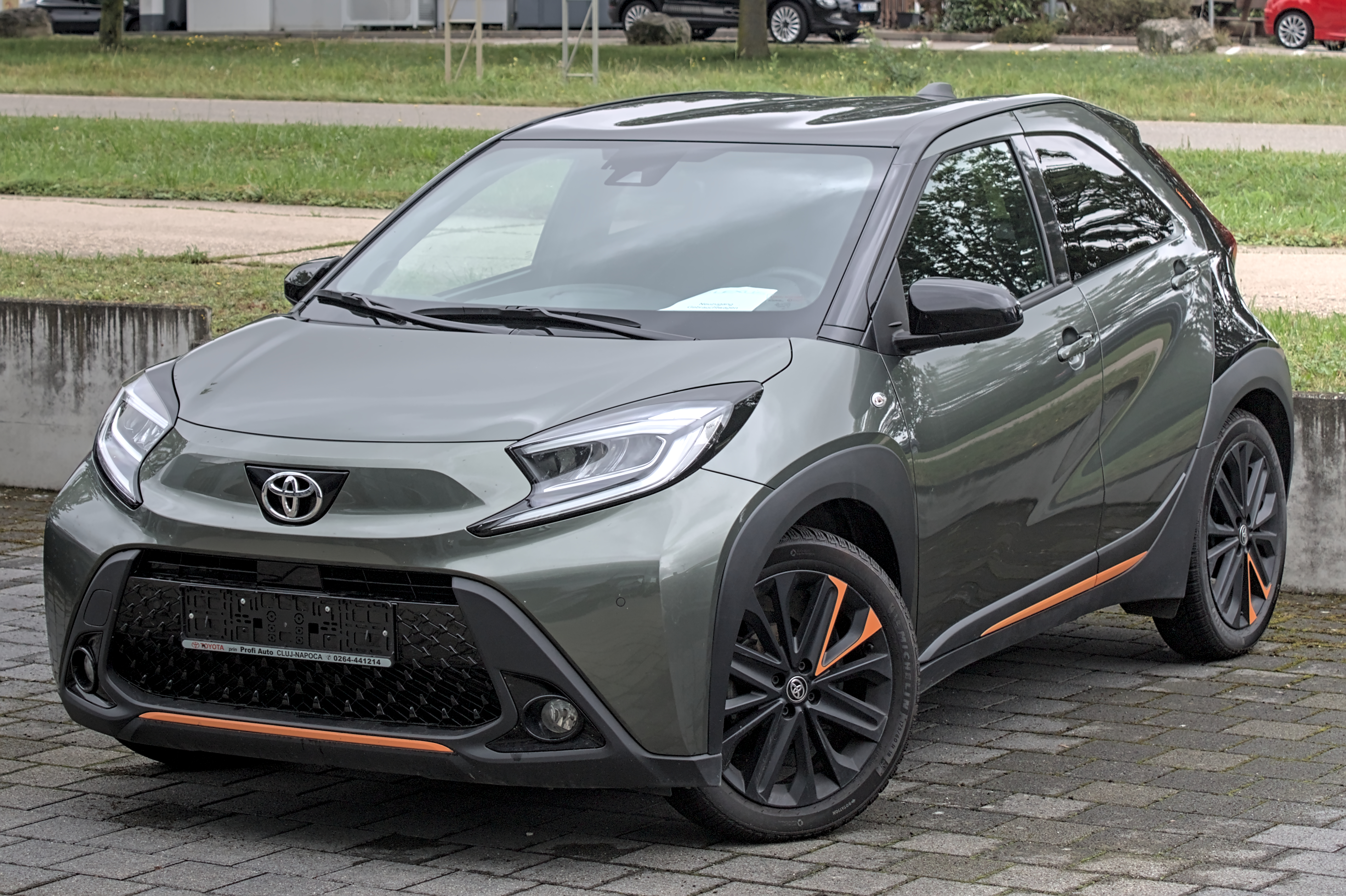
2022 Aygo X Limited Edition (KGB70, Germany)

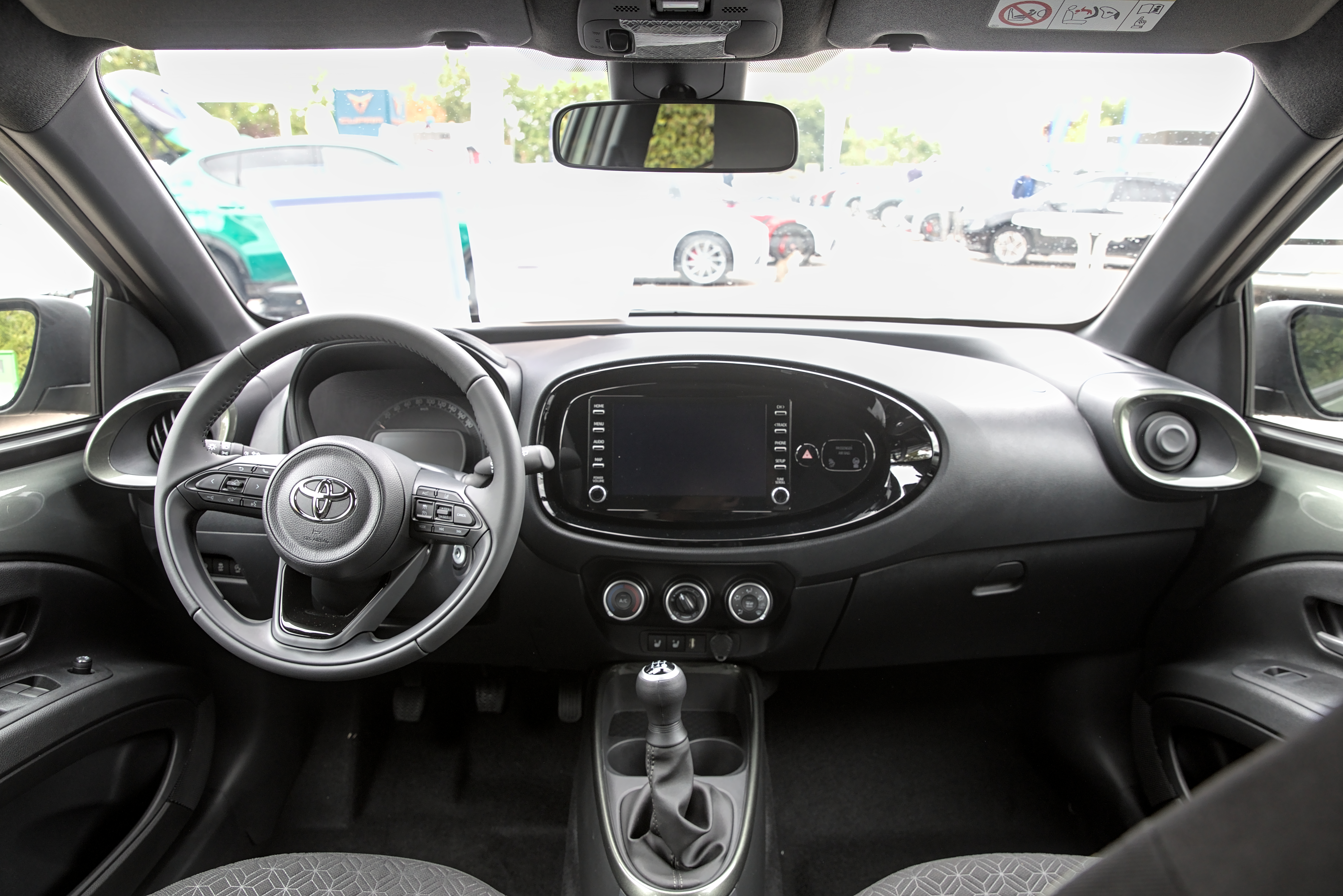
Interior

=== Aygo X Air Edition ===
The Aygo X Air Edition is a special edition available in the UK, offering more options along with a canvas roof. It will be available exclusively online via the Toyota UK website.

=== Facelift ===
The facelift for the Aygo X was unveiled on 2 June 2025. The changes include a redesigned front fascia with the front overhang extended by 76 mm (3.0 in), new alloy wheels designs, the drum brakes used for the rear braking system were replaced with disc brakes, and a new GR Sport trim. Inside, there is a new 7-inch digital instrument cluster replacing analogue dials, redesigned steering wheel with an installed infrared sensor (for the EU-mandated driver attention monitoring system), an updated infotainment system, and the addition of dual USB-C ports and electronic parking brake, and a reconfigured centre console with the two stacks of battery cells for the hybrid system installed side-by-side for increased interior space (the first time on the Toyota hybrid vehicle). For safety, the facelift model saw the Aygo X upgraded with the latest Toyota Safety Sense driver assistance features and software over-the-air updates for the safety features. For powertrains, The 1KR-B52 1.0-litre petrol used in the pre-facelift model was replaced with the M15A-FXE 1.5-litre petrol hybrid for the facelift model.

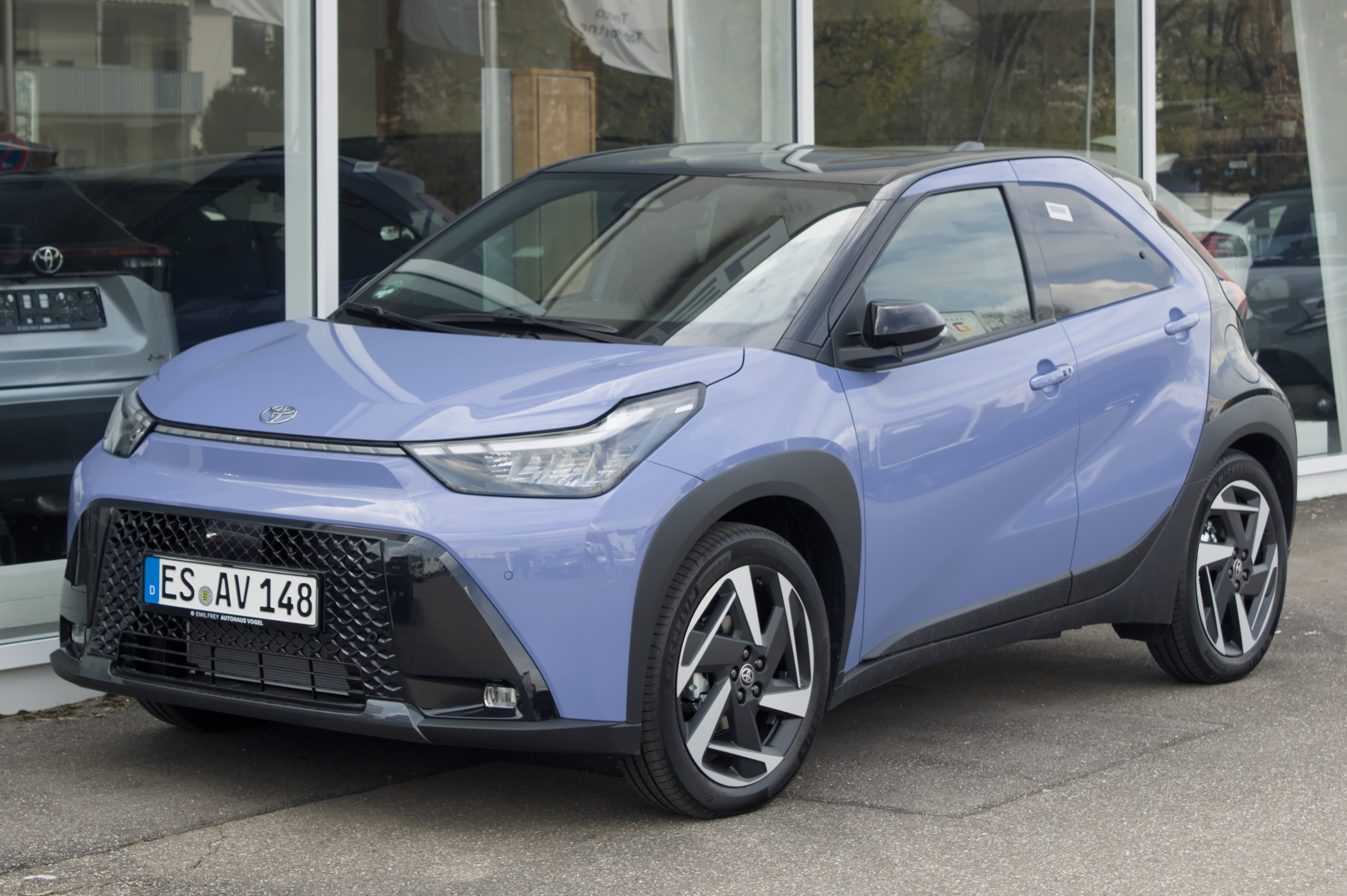
2026 Aygo X Hybrid

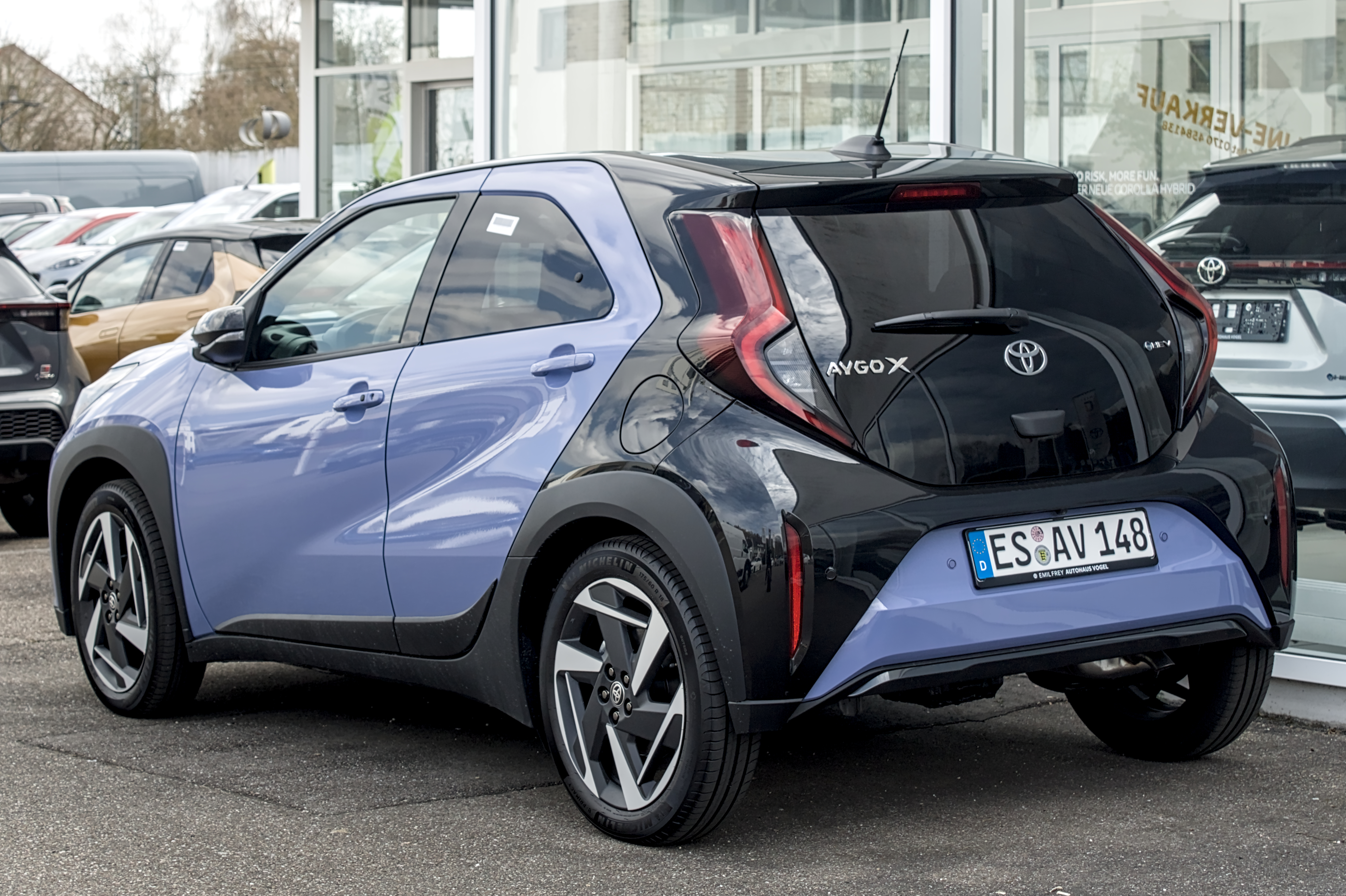
Rear view (2026)

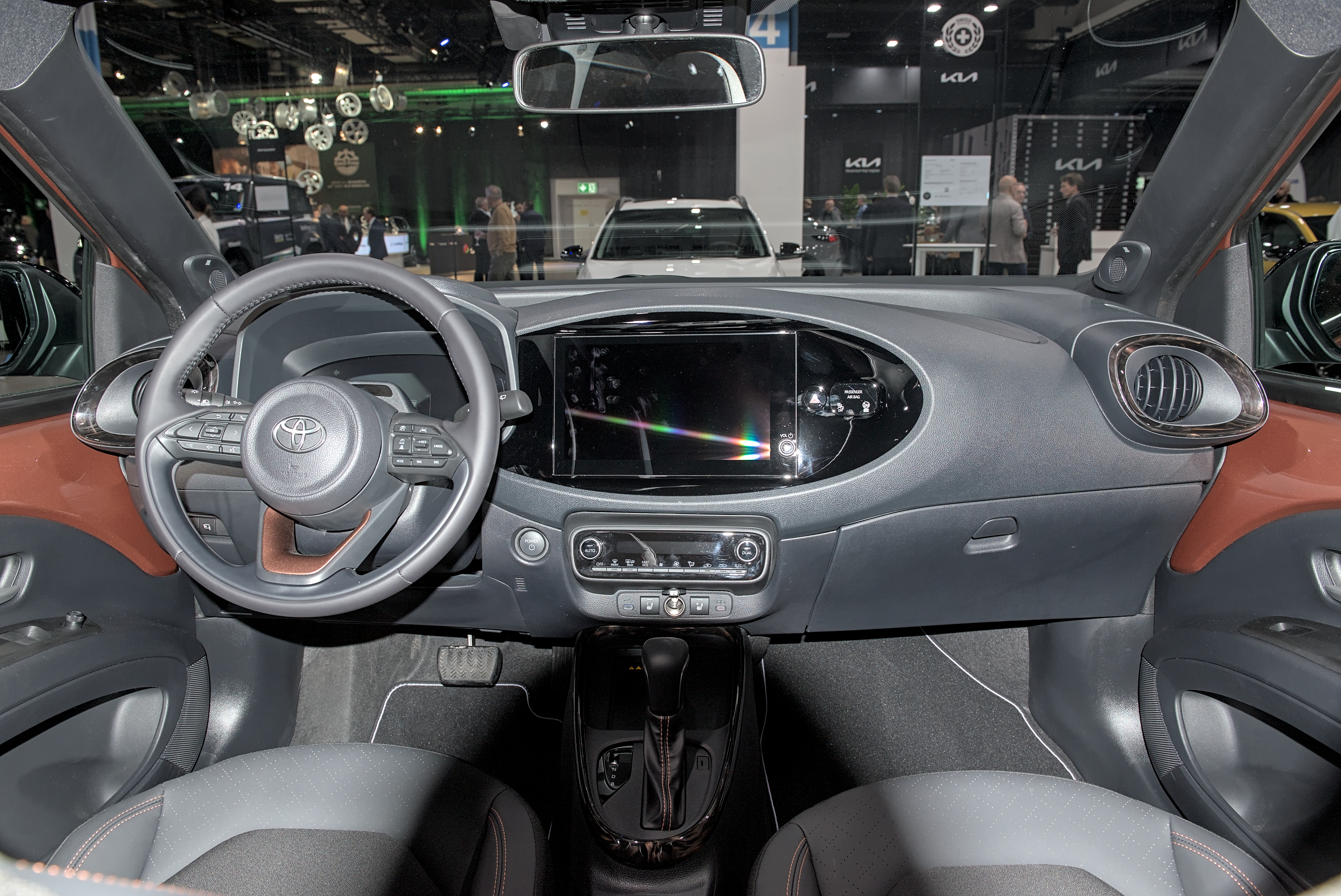
Interior (2025)

== Concept ==
The Aygo X was prefigured by the Aygo X Prologue concept car presented on 17 March 2021.

== Specifications ==
The Aygo X is built on the shortened version of the GA-B platform. The platform therefore differs from the first two generations of the Aygo, which were produced at the TMMCZ plant in Kolín, Czech Republic, where the Aygo X is also produced. The 1.0-litre 1KR-B52 engine is retained from the previous Aygo models.

== Technical specifications ==
Petrol engines
Chassis code	Model	Engine	Transmission	Power	Torque	0–100 km/h (0–62 mph) time	Top speed	CO_{2} emission
KGB70	1.0	998 cc 1KR-B52 DOHC 12-valve indirect/multi-point injected straight-three with VVT-i	5-speed manual /CVT	54 kW (72 hp; 73 PS) at 6,000 rpm	93 N⋅m (69 lb⋅ft) at 4,400 rpm	14.9 seconds	158 km/h (98 mph)	109 g/km (6.2 oz/mi)

== Safety ==
=== Euro NCAP ===
The Aygo X in its standard European market configuration received 4 stars from Euro NCAP in 2022.

Euro NCAP test results Aygo X (2022)
Test	Points	%
Overall:	4 /5 stars	
Adult occupant:	29.9	78%
Child occupant:	38.5	78%
Pedestrian:	40.3	74%
Safety assist:	13.0	81%

Euro NCAP test results Aygo X (2025)
Test	Points	%
Overall:	4 /5 stars	
Adult occupant:	29.2	73%
Child occupant:	35.3	72%
Pedestrian:	52.9	83%
Safety assist:	12.4	68%

== Sales ==
Year	Europe (Note: Toyota Motor Europe: Europe including Russia and Turkey + Armenia, Georgia, Azerbaijan, Kazakhstan and Israel)
2022	74,427
2023	90,582
2024	97,466
2025	98,838

== See also ==
- List of Toyota vehicles
