= List of Toyota factories =

This list comprises Toyota's manufacturing facilities worldwide, as well as others that are jointly owned by the company or run under a contract.

== Toyota manufacturing facilities ==
=== Asia ===
==== Japan ====
There are a total of sixteen Toyota-owned factories in Japan. All but three of these are located in or near Toyota City, while the others are located in Kyushu, Hokkaido and northern Honshu.

Operator		Plant name	Location	Current main products	Start of operations	Unit production	Employees
Toyota Motor Corporation		Honsha	Toyota, Aichi	Forged parts, hybrid system parts, fuel cell system parts, chassis parts	1938-11		1,776
Toyota Motor Corporation		Motomachi	Toyota, Aichi	Century, Crown, Lexus LC, Mirai, GR Corolla, GR Yaris, Noah, Voxy, C+pod, bZ4X/Subaru Solterra, Lexus RZ	1959-08	73,000	4,085
Toyota Motor Corporation		Kamigo	Toyota, Aichi	Engines M, K, S, R, T	1965-11		3,034
Toyota Motor Corporation		Takaoka	Toyota, Aichi	RAV4, Harrier, Corolla, Corolla Touring, Corolla Cross, C-HR+	1966-09	179,000	3,293
Toyota Motor Corporation		Miyoshi	Miyoshi, Aichi	Transmission-related parts, forged parts, engine-related parts	1968-07	–	1,456
Toyota Motor Corporation		Tsutsumi	Toyota, Aichi	Camry, Corolla Sport, Crown, Prius, Prius PHV	1970-12	510,000	5,045
Toyota Motor Corporation		Myochi	Miyoshi, Aichi	Powertrain-related parts	1973-06		1,512
Toyota Motor Corporation		Shimoyama	Miyoshi, Aichi	Engines, fuel cell tanks	1975-03		1,535
Toyota Motor Corporation		Kinu-ura	Hekinan, Aichi	Transmission-related parts	1978-08		3,062
Toyota Motor Corporation		Tahara	Tahara, Aichi	Lexus LS, Lexus IS, Lexus GX, Lexus LM, Lexus NX, Land Cruiser Prado, 4Runner, Century (SUV), RAV4, engines	1979-01	396,000	7,821
Toyota Motor Corporation		Teiho	Toyota, Aichi	Mechanical equipment, moldings for resin and casting and forging	1986-02		1,083
Toyota Motor Corporation		Hirose	Toyota, Aichi	Research and development and production of electronic control devices, ICs	1989-03		1,605
Toyota Auto Body		Kariya	Kariya, Aichi	Vehicles for the elderly and people with disabilities "Welcab", Coms	1945-08-31		
Toyota Auto Body		Kotobuki New Development Center	Toyota, Aichi		1960-05		
Toyota Auto Body		Yoshiwara	Toyota, Aichi	Lexus LX, Land Cruiser (J300), Land Cruiser (J70), Coaster	1962-01		
Toyota Auto Body		Fujimatsu	Kariya, Aichi	Voxy, Noah, Prius	1964-01		
Toyota Auto Body		Inabe	Inabe, Mie	Alphard, Vellfire, Lexus LM, HiAce	1993-12		
Toyota Auto Body		Gifu Auto Body Honsha	Kakamigahara, Gifu	HiAce, ambulances	1940-10		
Toyota Motor Kyushu		Miyata	Miyawaka, Fukuoka	Lexus ES, Lexus RX, Lexus NX, Lexus UX, engines, hybrid system parts	1992-12-22	309,000	7,154
Toyota Motor Kyushu		Kanda	Miyako, Fukuoka	Engines	2005-12-20		
Toyota Motor Kyushu		Kokura	Kokura, Kitakyushu, Fukuoka	Transaxles	2008-08-01		
Toyota Motor Hokkaido			Tomakomai, Hokkaido	Transmissions, powertrain-related parts	1991-02-08		2,394
Toyota Motor East Japan	Former Kanto Auto Works	Higashi Fuji	Susono, Shizuoka	Closed	1967-05	343,000	7,441
Toyota Motor East Japan	Former Kanto Auto Works	Iwate	Kanegasaki, Iwate	Yaris, Yaris Cross, Aqua, Lexus LBX	1993-11		
Toyota Motor East Japan	Former Kanto Auto Works	Suyama (former Higashi Fuji Machine)	Susono, Shizuoka	Stamping molds for vehicles	2009-06		
Toyota Motor East Japan	Former Central Motor	Miyagi Ohira	Ōhira, Miyagi	Sienta, JPN Taxi, Corolla Axio, Corolla Fielder, auto bodies, auto parts, molds, machine tools, measuring instruments, and machinery and equipment	1950-09		
Toyota Motor East Japan	Former Toyota Motor Tohoku	Miyagi Taiwa	Taiwa, Miyagi	Electronically controlled brake actuators (ABS, ECB), axles, torque converters, etc.	1997-07		
Daihatsu		Ikeda	Ikeda, Osaka	Roomy, Copen GR Sport	1939-05		1,251
Daihatsu		Kyoto	Ōyamazaki, Kyoto	Probox	1973-04		1,151
Daihatsu		Ryūō	Ryūō, Shiga	Raize			
Daihatsu		Daihatsu Motor Kyushu	Nakatsu, Ōita	Pixis Epoch, Pixis Truck, Pixis Van	2004-11		2,346
Toyota Industries		Nagakusa	Ōbu, Aichi	RAV4, RAV4 PHV/Suzuki Across	1967		2,887
Hino Motors		Hamura	Hamura, Tokyo	Dyna, Land Cruiser 250			

==== Indonesia ====
- Toyota Motor Manufacturing Indonesia (TMMIN), Karawang, West Java
  - Plant 1 – Fortuner, Innova AN140, Innova AG10, bZ4X
  - Plant 2 – Avanza, Calya, Veloz, Yaris XP150 hatchback, Yaris Cross AC200
  - Plant 3 – Engines

==== Philippines ====
- Toyota Motor Philippines Corporation (TMPC), Santa Rosa, Laguna – Innova AN140, Vios XP150, Tamaraw

==== Thailand ====
- Toyota Motor Thailand (TMT)
  - Toyota Gateway plant, Hua Samrong, Chachoengsao – Yaris AC100 sedan, Yaris XP150 hatchback, Yaris Cross AC200, Camry, Corolla Altis, Corolla Cross
  - Toyota Samrong plant, Samrong Tai, Samut Prakan – Hilux
  - Toyota Ban Pho plant, Lad Kwang – Hilux, Hilux Champ, Fortuner, Land Cruiser FJ
  - Siam Toyota Manufacturing Co., Ltd., Chonburi – Engines
- Toyota Auto Works
  - Theparak plant, Samut Prakan — HiAce, Commuter

==== Vietnam ====
- Toyota Motor Vietnam, Phúc Yên, Phú Thọ – Fortuner, Innova AN140, Vios XP150, Veloz, Avanza

=== Europe ===
==== France ====
- Toyota Motor Manufacturing France (TMMF), Onnaing-Valenciennes – Yaris XP210 / Mazda2 Hybrid, Yaris Cross XP210

==== Belgium ====
- Brussels – European R&D facility since 1987. Similar facilities were opened in Germany (1993) and France (2000)
- Diest - European part factory opened in 1992

==== Czech Republic ====
- Toyota Motor Manufacturing Czech Republic (TMMCZ) (former joint venture with PSA Peugeot Citroën), Kolín, Czech Republic – Aygo X, Yaris XP210

==== Poland ====
- Toyota Motor Manufacturing Poland (TMMP) Sp. z o.o., Wałbrzych - Engines (both gasoline and diesel), semi-automatic and manual gear shifts and crankshafts.

==== Turkey ====
- Toyota Motor Manufacturing Turkey (TMMT), Arifiye, Sakarya Province – C-HR, Corolla saloon

==== United Kingdom ====
- Toyota Manufacturing UK (TMUK)
  - Burnaston, Derbyshire – Corolla hatchback and estate
  - Deeside, North Wales - Engines

=== North America ===
Facility	Location	Established	Products	Employees
Toyota Auto Body California	Long Beach, California	1972	Produces automotive parts	293
Toyota Motor Manufacturing Kentucky	Georgetown, Kentucky	1986	Assembles Camry and RAV4, and produces engines	7,800
Toyota Motor Manufacturing Canada	Cambridge, Ontario and Woodstock, Ontario, Canada	1986	Assembles RAV4, Lexus RX and Lexus NX	9,700
Toyota Motor Manufacturing Missouri	Troy, Missouri	1990	Produces aluminum cylinder heads	900
Toyota Motor Manufacturing Indiana	Princeton, Indiana	1996	Assembles Highlander, Grand Highlander, Sienna and Lexus TX	7,222
Toyota Motor Manufacturing West Virginia	Buffalo, West Virginia	1996	Produces engines and transmissions	1,479
Toyota Motor Manufacturing Alabama	Huntsville, Alabama	2001	Produces engines	1,150
Toyota Motor Manufacturing de Baja California	Tijuana, Baja California, Mexico	2002	Assembles Tacoma and produces truck beds	1,882
Toyota Motor Manufacturing Tennessee	Jackson, Tennessee	2003	Produces aluminum engine blocks	400
Toyota Motor Manufacturing Texas	San Antonio, Texas	2003	Assembles Sequoia and Tundra	2,660
Toyota Motor Manufacturing Mississippi	Blue Springs, Mississippi	2007	Assembles Corolla	1,824
Toyota Motor Manufacturing de Guanajuato	Apaseo el Grande, Guanajuato, Mexico	2019	Assembles Tacoma	1,764
Mazda Toyota Manufacturing USA (50% joint venture with Mazda)	Huntsville, Alabama	2021	Assembles Corolla Cross and Mazda CX-50	4,000
Toyota Battery Manufacturing North Carolina	Liberty, North Carolina	2025	Battery packs for electric vehicles	3,000
	References:			

=== South America ===
==== Argentina ====
- Toyota Argentina (TASA), Zárate, Buenos Aires Province – Hilux, SW4 (Fortuner) and HiAce. Production started in 1997.

==== Brazil ====
- Toyota do Brasil Ltda.
  - São Bernardo do Campo, São Paulo – Corolla & Hilux parts. Production of Land Cruiser Bandeirantes started in 1958 (first plant outside Japan). Vehicle production ended in 2001. Shut down in 2023.
  - Indaiatuba, São Paulo – Corolla saloon. Production started in 1998. Shut down in 2024.
  - Sorocaba, São Paulo – Corolla Cross, Yaris XP150 hatchback. Started in 2012.
  - Porto Feliz, São Paulo – Engines plant.

==== Venezuela ====
- Toyota de Venezuela, C.A (TDV), Cumana, Sucre State. This Plant located in the northeast of Venezuela, previously produces Corolla, Hilux, and Fortuner. Also formerly a large maker of Land Cruiser 40, 50, 60, 70 and 80 series, and 4Runner.

=== Africa ===
==== South Africa ====
- Toyota South Africa Motors (TSAM) – Prospecton, Durban – Corolla, Corolla Cross, Fortuner, Quantum, Hilux and an assortment of Hino Trucks. Assembly began in 1962, by Motor Assemblies who also built Volvos and Ramblers. Their Durban plant was opened in 1970, but they had been assembled for several years already. The Stout was the first Toyota available in South Africa, beginning in 1961.

== Joint venture, licensed, and contract factories ==
=== Portugal ===
- Stellantis Mangualde Plant, Mangualde – ProAce City
- Salvador Caetano - Toyota Caetano Portugal Plant, Ovar - Inaugurated in 1971, it was the first Toyota’s assembly plant in Europe.
  - Dyna, Land Cruiser (J70)
  - Caetano City Gold/Toyota Sora - low-floor, single-decker bus. The buses with hydrogen fuel cell and full electric powertrains are Toyota badged.

=== Austria ===
- Magna Steyr, Graz, Styria – Supra

=== France ===
- Stellantis Hordain Plant, Valenciennes-Hordain – ProAce

=== Türkiye ===
- Karsan Akçalar Plant, Akçalar – ProAce City
- Tofaş Bursa Plant, Bursa – ProAce

=== United Kingdom ===
- Vauxhall Ellesmere Port Plant, Ellesmere Port – ProAce City
- Vauxhall Luton Plant, Luton – ProAce

=== China ===
- FAW Toyota
  - Tianjin – bZ3, bZ5, Corolla, Corolla Cross, Crown Kluger, Granvia, Harrier
  - Chengdu – Coaster, Avalon, Land Cruiser Prado
  - Changchun – RAV4
- GAC Toyota, Guangzhou – bZ4X, bZ3X, Camry, Frontlander, Wildlander, Highlander, Levin L, Sienna

=== Colombia ===
- Inchcape Colombia, formerly PRACO Didacol – Since 2005, the plant only produces Hino trucks.

=== India ===
- Toyota Kirloskar Motor (TKM), Bidadi, Karnataka
  - Plant 1 – Innova AN140, Innova AG10, Fortuner, Hilux
  - Plant 2 – Camry, Urban Cruiser Hyryder
- Maruti Suzuki – Belta, Rumion, Vitz
- Suzuki Motor Gujarat – Glanza/Starlet, Urban Cruiser Taisor/Starlet Cross

=== Indonesia ===
- Astra Daihatsu Motor (ADM)
  - Sunter, Jakarta – LiteAce/TownAce/Mazda Bongo
  - Karawang, West Java – Agya/Wigo, Avanza, Calya, Raize, Rush

=== Italy ===
- Stellantis Atessa Plant, Atessa – ProAce Max

=== Japan ===
- Subaru Corporation, Ōta, Gunma – GR86

=== Malaysia ===
- Sime Darby Motor Sdn. Bhd.
  - Assembly Services Sdn. Bhd., Shah Alam, Selangor – Fortuner, Hilux.
  - Toyota Bukit Raja Plant, Bukit Raja, Selangor – Corolla Cross, Vios AC100, Yaris XP150, Yaris Cross AC200
- Perodua Manufacturing – Veloz

=== Pakistan ===
- Indus Motors Company, Karachi – Corolla Altis, Corolla Cross, Fortuner, Hilux, Yaris

=== Poland ===
- Stellantis Gliwice Plant, Gliwice – ProAce Max

=== Spain ===
- Stellantis Vigo Plant, Vigo – ProAce City

=== Taiwan ===
- Kuozui Motors – Corolla Altis, Corolla Cross, TownAce, Vios XP150, Yaris Cross AC200, Noah/Voxy

=== Uruguay ===
- Nordex S.A., Montevideo – ProAce

=== Hino Motors ===
- Ontario, California (2004) – Toyota components and Hino trucks
- Marion, Arkansas (2006) – Differential, rear axle and suspension related parts
- Mineral Wells, West Virginia (2018) – Class 6, 7, 8 trucks
- Williamstown, West Virginia (2007) – Class 6, 7 trucks
- Woodstock, Ontario (2006) – Class 6, 7 trucks
- Guanajuato, Mexico (2009) – 500 series trucks with partner Mitsui

== Former joint venture, licensed, and Toyota factories ==
=== Australia ===
- Altona, Victoria (1963–2017) – Corolla, Aurion, Avalon, Camry
- Holden/United Australian Automobile Industries (1987–1996) – Lexcen

=== Colombia ===
- SOFASA, Envigado (1996–2009, contract facility) – Land Cruiser, Hilux

=== Ghana ===
- Toyota Industries, Accra (contract facility) – Vitz/Yaris, RAV4

=== New Zealand ===
- Christchurch plant and two others, Sockburn (1980–1996)

=== Russian Federation ===
- Toyota Motor Manufacturing Russia (TMMR), Saint Petersburg – Camry, RAV4 (2005–2022)
- OOO Sollers-Bussan, Vladivostok – Land Cruiser Prado (defunct 2022)

=== United States ===
- Subaru of Indiana Automotive, Inc., Lafayette, Indiana (2007–2016, contract facility) – Camry
- New United Motor Manufacturing, Inc., Fremont, California, (1984–2010, 50% joint venture with General Motors) – Corolla, Tacoma
