= Toyota Motor Europe =

European subsidiary company

- Logo used since 20 July 2020
- Type: Subsidiary
- Industry: Automotive
- Founded: 1963; 63 years ago in Denmark
- Headquarters: Brussels, Belgium
- Area served: Europe and Western Asia
- Key people: Didier Leroy (Chairman); Yoshihiro Nakata (President & CEO); Matthew Harrison (Chief Corporate Officer)
- Products: Toyota and Lexus vehicles
- Number of employees: 2,700
- Parent: Toyota Motor Corporation
- Website: toyota-europe.com

Toyota Motor Europe (TME) is a subsidiary of Toyota Motor Corporation, overseeing operations across Europe and Western Asia, including Turkey, Russia, Israel, Kazakhstan, and the Caucasus. TME’s activities encompass research and development, manufacturing, sales, marketing, after-sales, and various corporate functions. Headquartered in Brussels, Belgium, TME commenced operations in 1963.

== History ==
TME began the manufacturing and sale of cars in Europe under an official distributor agreement in 1963.

TME oversees the wholesale sales and marketing of Toyota and Lexus vehicles, parts, and accessories, and Toyota’s European manufacturing and engineering operations. Toyota employs approximately 90,000 people in Europe, with a €11+ billion investment since 1990. Toyota’s operations in Europe are supported by a network of 31 National Marketing and Sales Companies across 49 countries, a total of around 3,000 sales outlets, and nine manufacturing plants.

Previous CEOs include:

- Matt Harrison (2021-2023)
- Dr. Johan Van Zyl (2015-2021)
- Didier Leroy (2010-2015)
- Tadashi Arashima (2005-2010)
- Akira Imai (1999-2005)
- Tatsuo Takahashi (1994-1999)

== Sales ==
Toyota became the highest-selling Japanese car manufacturer in Europe in 1998, overtaking Nissan.

Toyota Motor Europe sales peaked in 2007 at 1.23 million units, as well as a 5.70% market share. In 2021, TME set a new peak with a market share of 5.84%.

In 2022, TME set another peak with a market share of 7.3%.

== Operations ==
The Toyota Motor Europe (TME) Head Office, located in Brussels, Belgium, serves as the central hub for Toyota and Lexus operations across Europe. This strategic headquarters houses key departments overseeing European activities, including manufacturing, engineering, marketing, and sales. TME coordinates efforts with several major manufacturing centres throughout Europe, particularly in France and the Czech Republic, ensuring streamlined operations and robust market presence.

=== Supporting facilities ===
Established in 1987, the Toyota Technical Centre in Zaventem, Belgium, is home to Toyota Motor Europe’s Research & Development (R&D), Purchasing and Production Engineering activities. Early in 2006, Toyota inaugurated the expansion of its technical centre. In 2007 an additional 35,000 m² was added for the expanded European design and engineering department.

The Toyota Training Centre in Zaventem provides training to service instructors and engineers from all of Toyota’s European distributors.

Located in Derbyshire, the European Global Production Centre is a hub for teaching best practices and training production staff and supervisors from Europe.

The Accessory and Service Centre of Toyota in Brussels is responsible for after-sales, conversion, and accessory operations. Its responsibilities include the coordination of Toyota's aftersales service operations, the investigation of technical issues in the field, car body and paint training, accessory development and planning, and vehicle conversion.

Created in 2000 in Nice, France, Toyota Europe Design Development (ED2, stylized ED²) concentrates on design concepts for the European market, including advanced design, design competition, and production support for European models and design research information. It replaced the Zaventem-based Toyota European Office of Creation (EPOC), founded in 1989. Since 2016, the Toyota Design Centre of Zaventem re-opened to take the weight off ED² by helping it to develop production cars, such as the Toyota Aygo X.

Le Rendez- Vous Toyota in Paris is a venue for internal and public events.

=== Manufacturing centres ===
- Toyota Motor Manufacturing Czech Republic – Kolín
- Toyota Motor Manufacturing France – Onnaing
- Toyota Motor Manufacturing Poland
  - Engine Plant – Jelcz-Laskowice
  - Engine & Transmission Plant – Wałbrzych
- Toyota Caetano Portugal – Ovar
- Toyota Motor Manufacturing Russia – Saint Petersburg (defunct 2022)
- Toyota Motor Manufacturing Turkey – Arifiye
- Toyota Manufacturing UK
  - Vehicle Assembly Plant – Burnaston
  - Engine Plant – Deeside

Toyota also operates a joint venture plant with Citroën and Peugeot in Valenciennes, France.

=== Other facilities ===
Toyota Gazoo Racing Europe - Cologne, Germany. Research, development and manufacturing for motor racing activities.

== Environmental activities ==
In 2008, Toyota began its European sustainable plant program at two manufacturing companies in France and the United Kingdom. The activities are supposed to emphasize the role of nature in creating production sites that are in harmony with their natural surroundings. TMMF (Valenciennes, France) and TMUK (Burnaston and Deeside, UK) will ramp up efforts in Europe by serving as the industry benchmark for sustainable production of vehicles and engines. Each plant will pilot activities to help realize 2010 environmental targets, including a 25% reduction in water use by Toyota’s European manufacturing network. Toyota intends to adapt these methods for their plants globally if successful.

== Vehicles designed by Toyota ED² ==
Production cars (partially or totally designed by Toyota Europe Design Development):

- Lexus SC (2001),
- Toyota Yaris I (2001),
- Toyota Avensis II (2003),
- Toyota Corolla Verso II (2004),
- Toyota Yaris II (2005),
- Toyota Auris I (2006),
- Toyota Avensis III (2009),
- Lexus IS III (2013),
- Toyota Avensis III Restylée (2012),
- Toyota Verso Restylé (2013),
- Toyota Land Cruiser J150 Restylé (2013),
- Toyota Avensis III Restylée (2015),
- Toyota C-HR (2016),
- Toyota Yaris III Restylée (2017),
- Toyota Yaris IV (2020),
- Toyota Yaris Cross (2020),
- Toyota e-Palette (2020),
- Toyota bZ4X (2021).

Concept cars:

- Toyota CS&S (2003),
- Toyota Motor Triathlon Race Car (2004),
- Toyota Endo (2005),
- Toyota Urban Cruiser Concept (2006),
- Toyota Hybrid X (2007),
- Toyota IQ Concept (2007),
- Toyota FT-86 Concept (2009),
- Toyota FT-CH (2010),
- Toyota ME.WE (2013, with the Studio Massaud),
- Toyota C-HR Concept (2015),
- Lexus LF-SA (2015),
- Toyota i-TRIL (2017),
- Lexus UX Concept (2017),
- Toyota e-Care (2019),
- Toyota e-4me (2019),
- Toyota e-Trans (2019),
- Toyota e-Racer (2019),
- Lexus LF-30 (2019),
- Toyota Aygo X Prologue (2021),
- Toyota Compact Cruiser EV (2022),
- Toyota bZ Compact SUV (2022),
- Toyota C-HR Prologue (2022).

Other works:

- Skyjet and yacht for the movie Valérian and the City of a Thousand Planets (2017),
- Toyota e-Chargeair (2019), autonomous H2 charging system,
- Lexus "Lunar Concepts" sketches for Document Journal art magazine: Lexus Zero Gravity, Lexus Cosmos, Lexus Bouncing Moon Roller, Lexus Lunar Cruiser, Lexus Lunar Mission, Lexus Moon Racer and Lexus Lunar (2020)
