= Johan van Zyl =

South African businessperson (1958–2021)

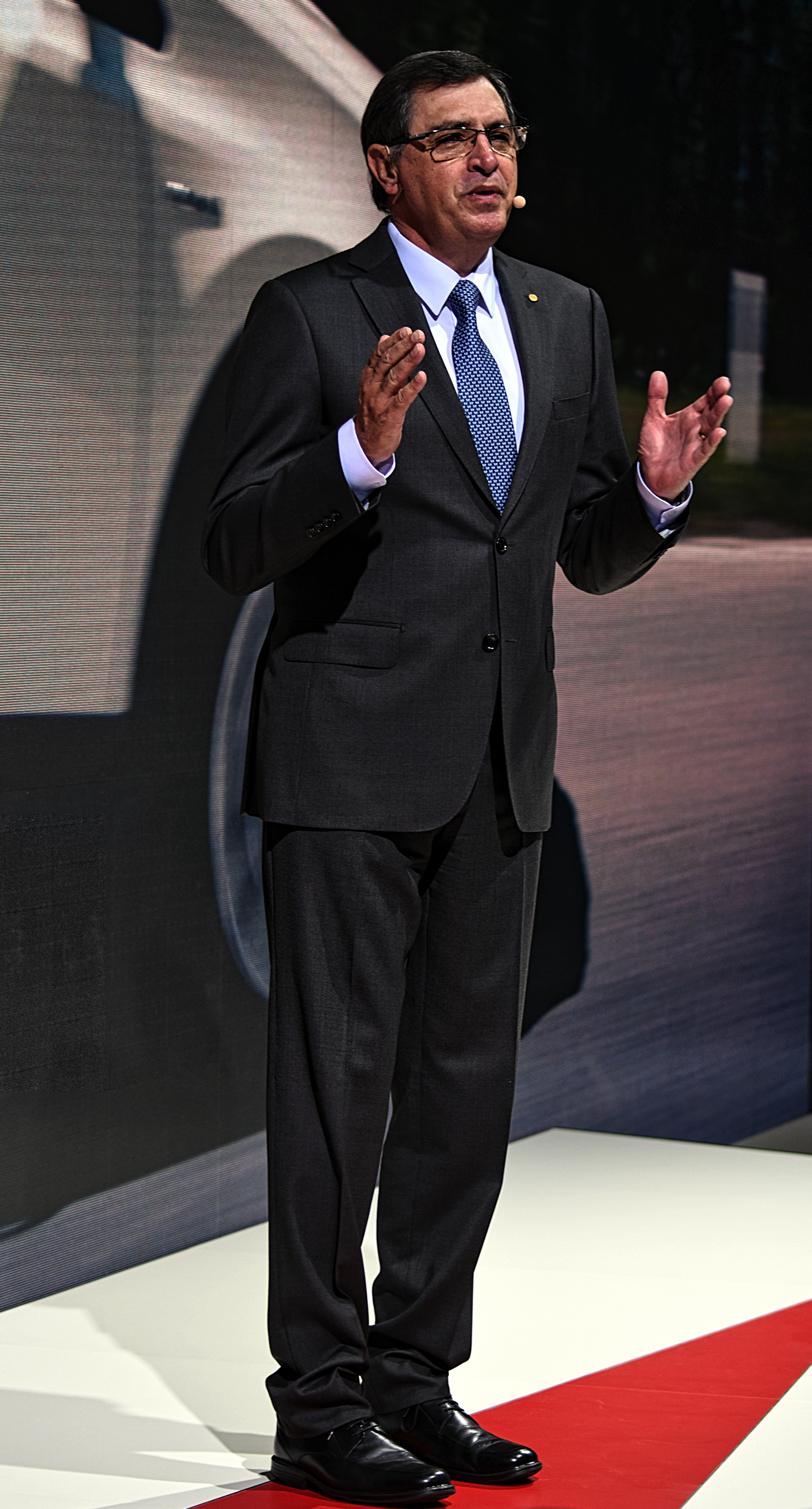
- Van Zyl in 2017
- Born: 5 June 1958; Springs, South Africa
- Died: 30 July 2021 (aged 63); Pretoria, South Africa
- Occupation: businessperson

Johan van Zyl (8 June 1958 – 30 July 2021) was a South African business executive. He was an executive of Toyota, serving as chairman, president and chief executive officer of Toyota Motor Europe from 2015 to 2021.

== Biography ==
Van Zyl graduated from Potchefstroom University in 1986 with a doctor of philosophy degree in business administration. In 1993, he joined Toyota as director of Toyota Motor Sales South Africa. In 1995, he became director of marketing at Toyota South Africa Motors. In 1996, he was promoted to managing director of Toyota South Africa Motors, president and chief operating officer in 2002 and president and chief executive officer in 2003. In 2009, van Zyl was appointed a managing officer of Toyota Motor Corporation. In 2013, he became chief executive officer of Toyota's Africa operations. In 2015, he was appointed president and chief executive officer of Toyota Motor Europe. In 2016, van Zyl was appointed chairman of Toyota Motor Sales South Africa and senior managing officer of Toyota Motor Corporation in 2017. He also dealt with the United Kingdom's withdrawal from the European Union. He retired from Toyota Motor Europe in April 2021, but remained chairman of Toyota South Africa Motors.

In July 2021, van Zyl tested positive for COVID-19. He received medical treatment, but died at a hospital in Pretoria on 30 July. He was 63 years old.
