= Toyota Yaris (XP210) =

Fourth-generation Toyota Yaris

Toyota Yaris (XP210/MXPA1#/MXPH1#)
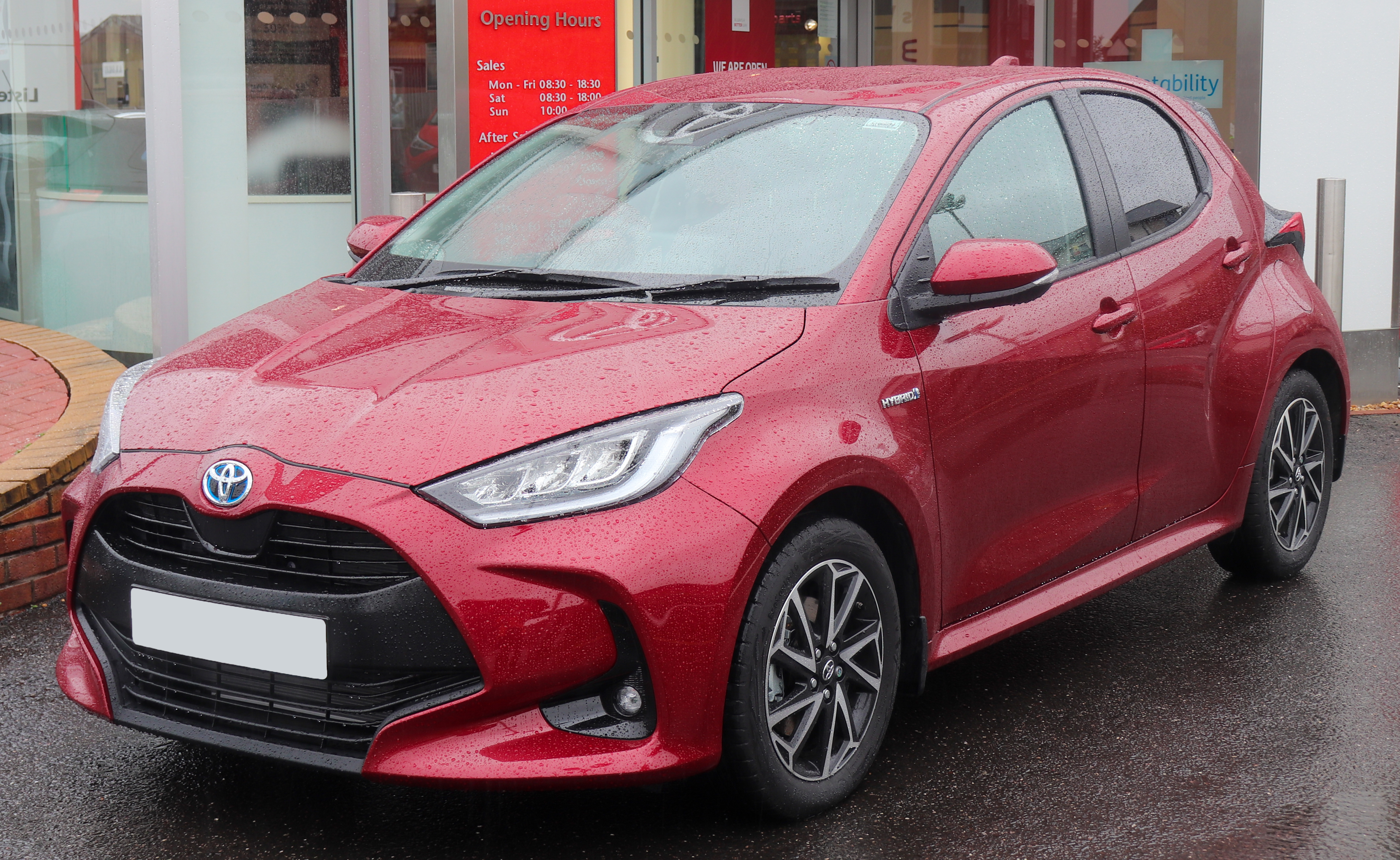
- 2020 Toyota Yaris Design Hybrid (MXPH11, UK)

Overview
- Manufacturer: Toyota
- Model code: XP210
- Also called: Mazda2 Hybrid (Europe, 2022–present)
- Production: February 2020 – present
- Assembly: Japan: Kanegasaki, Iwate (TMEJ); France: Onnaing (TMMF); Czech Republic: Kolín (TMMCZ)
- Designer: Mario Majdandžić

Body and chassis
- Class: Subcompact car / Supermini (B)
- Body style: 5-door hatchback
- Layout: Front-engine, front-wheel-drive; Front-engine, four-wheel-drive (Japan)
- Platform: TNGA: GA-B
- Related: Toyota GR Yaris; Toyota Yaris Cross (XP210); Toyota Aqua (XP210); Toyota Aygo X; Toyota Sienta (XP210); Mitsuoka Viewt Story

Powertrain
- Engine: Petrol: 996 cc 1KR-FE VVT-i I3 (KSP210); 1490 cc M15A-FKS I3 (MXPA10, MXPA11, MXPA15); Petrol hybrid: 1490 cc M15A-FXE I3 (MXPH11, MXPH14, MXPH17)
- Electric motor: 1NM AC synchronous (front, hybrid); 1MM AC synchronous (rear, hybrid)
- Transmission: 5-speed manual; 6-speed manual; K120 CVT with physical first gear; eCVT (hybrid models only)
- Hybrid drivetrain: Power-split
- Battery: 177.6 V lithium-ion (hybrid)

Dimensions
- Wheelbase: 2,550 mm (100.4 in) (Japan and Australasia); 2,560 mm (100.8 in) (Europe)
- Length: 3,940 mm (155.1 in)
- Width: 1,695 mm (66.7 in) (Japan and Australasia); 1,745 mm (68.7 in) (Europe)
- Height: 1,500–1,515 mm (59.1–59.6 in) (Japan and Australasia); 1,470–1,500 mm (57.9–59.1 in) (Europe)
- Curb weight: 940–1,180 kg (2,072–2,601 lb) (Japan)

Chronology
- Predecessor: Toyota Vitz/Yaris (XP130); Toyota Prius c (hybrid, Australasia)

The XP210 (MXPA1#/MXPH1#) series Toyota Yaris is the fourth generation of the Yaris, a subcompact car/supermini (B-segment) manufactured by Toyota for the Japanese, European and Australasian markets. The model was released in October 2019 to replace the XP130 series Yaris/Vitz, and built on the GA-B platform. Unlike the preceding Vitz-based Yaris models, the standard XP210 series Yaris variants are only available in 5-door hatchback bodywork; the bespoke 3-door model is reserved for the performance-oriented variant called GR Yaris.

== Overview ==
Built on the GA-B platform, the development of the XP210 series Yaris was led by chief engineer Yasunori Suezawa and chief hybrid engineer Takashi Uehara under the internal "Toyota Compact Car Company". During its development, Toyota CEO Akio Toyoda in 2015 decided to delay the planned launch of the vehicle by one year to revise the GA-B platform, which was initially larger, heavier, and more expensive than targeted, since it shared many parts with other larger TNGA platforms. The vehicle had been seen testing in July 2019 at the Nürburgring circuit in Germany.

The XP210 series Yaris was then unveiled simultaneously on 16 October 2019 in Japan and Amsterdam, Netherlands. It went on sale in Japan on 10 February 2020, while the petrol 4WD variant went on sale in April 2020.

== Markets ==
=== Japan ===
The Japanese market Yaris was launched on 10 February 2020. It marked the debut of the Yaris nameplate in the market, as its predecessors were badged as Vitz. The rebrand was attributed to a sharp drop in sales, and as an effort to expand its middle-aged customer base. The other reasons of the name change is its WRC popularity and the unification of Toyota sales network in Japan. Prior to this generation, the Vitz was an exclusive model of the Netz Store dealerships, while the newer Yaris is positioned as a widely available compact car since the unification of Japanese dealership line-up in May 2020.

The Japanese-built XP210 series Yaris retained the 1,695 mm (66.7 in) width of the previous generation Vitz in order to stay in the "compact car" classification of Japanese government dimension regulations. Three powertrain options are offered, ranging from the base 1.0-litre petrol, 1.5-litre petrol and 1.5-litre petrol hybrid engines. Four-wheel drive is available as an option for 1.5-litre models, with the hybrid version received an "E-Four" electric four-wheel drive system. 6-speed manual transmission is only available for the 1.5-litre conventional petrol engine. Trim levels offered are X "B package", X, G, and Z.

Since February 2023, a modified version of the XP210 series Yaris is sold by Mitsuoka as the Mitsuoka Viewt Story, which is a fourth-generation Viewt. It replaced the previous Nissan March-based Viewt. Like its previous iterations, its design was inspired by the Jaguar Mark 2.

The facelifted Japanese market Yaris was released on 17 January 2024 with redesigned grille.

The special edition Yaris Z "Urbano" was released in early 2025. Like the regular Z grade, the Urbano is offered with either 1.5-litre gasoline or hybrid with the choice of front-wheel drive or all-wheel drive. The Z "Urbano" comes with all black color of front and rear emblems, roof, door handles, side window molding, and roof spoiler. It also has Urbano fender emblem and gloss black 16-inch alloy wheels. Other special features are "Urbano" logo projection illumination, as well as "Urbano" steering wheel emblem, floor mats, and scuff plates. Accessories packages from GR-Parts are also available.

The Japanese market Yaris got a minor change when the Yaris Z "Urbano" with manual transmission was released on 2 March 2026.

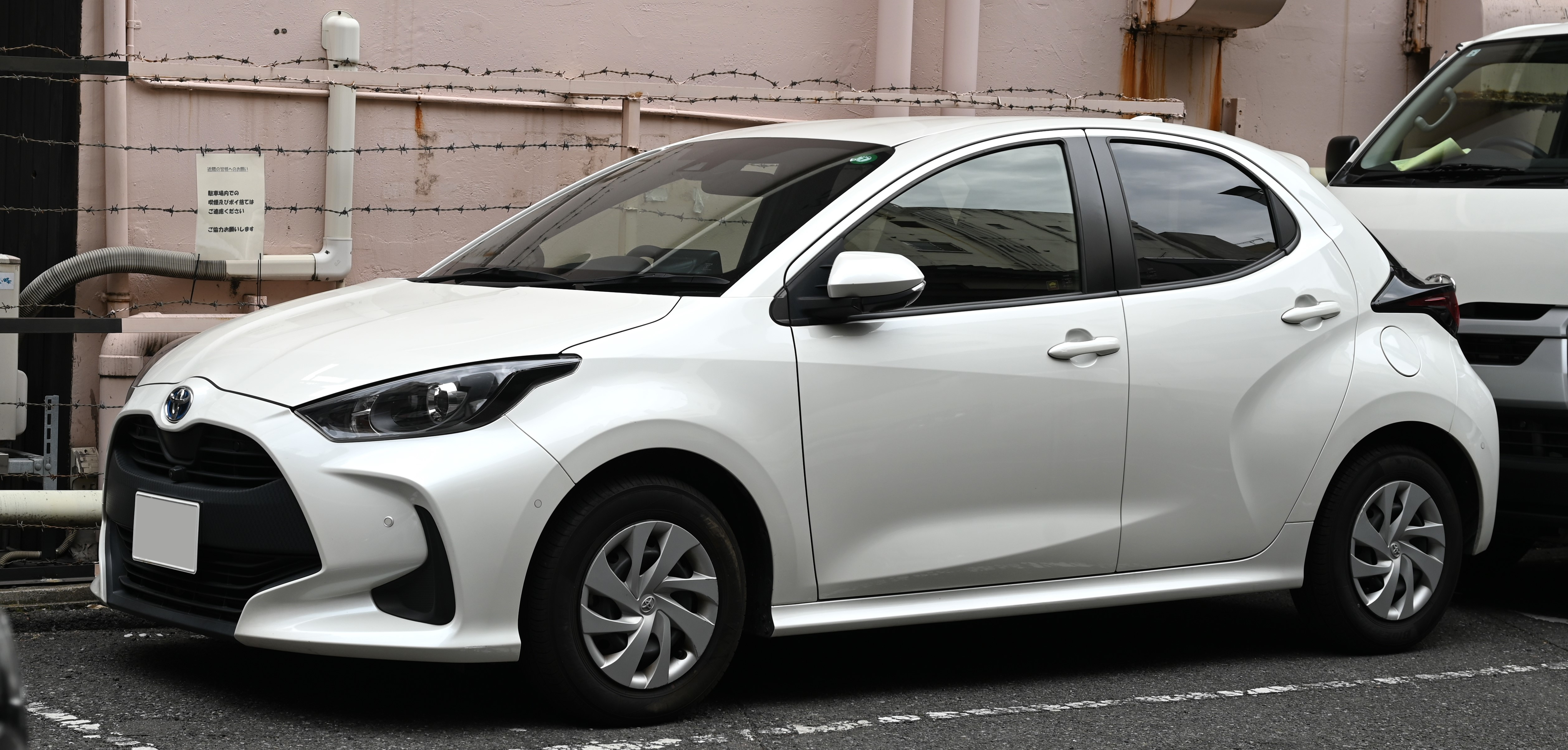
2020 Toyota Yaris Hybrid (MXPH10, Japan)

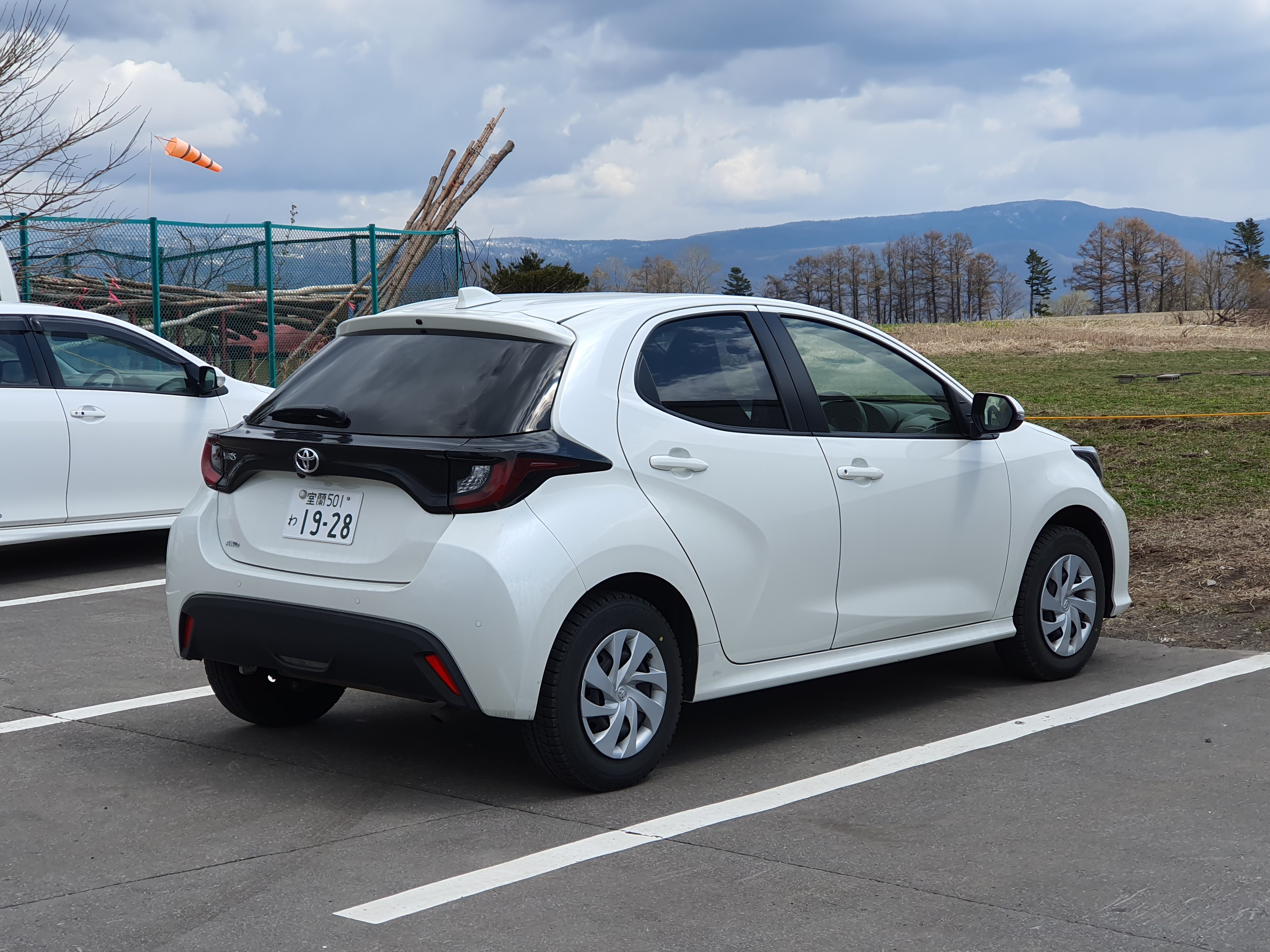
Toyota Yaris 1.5 AWD (MXPA15, Japan)

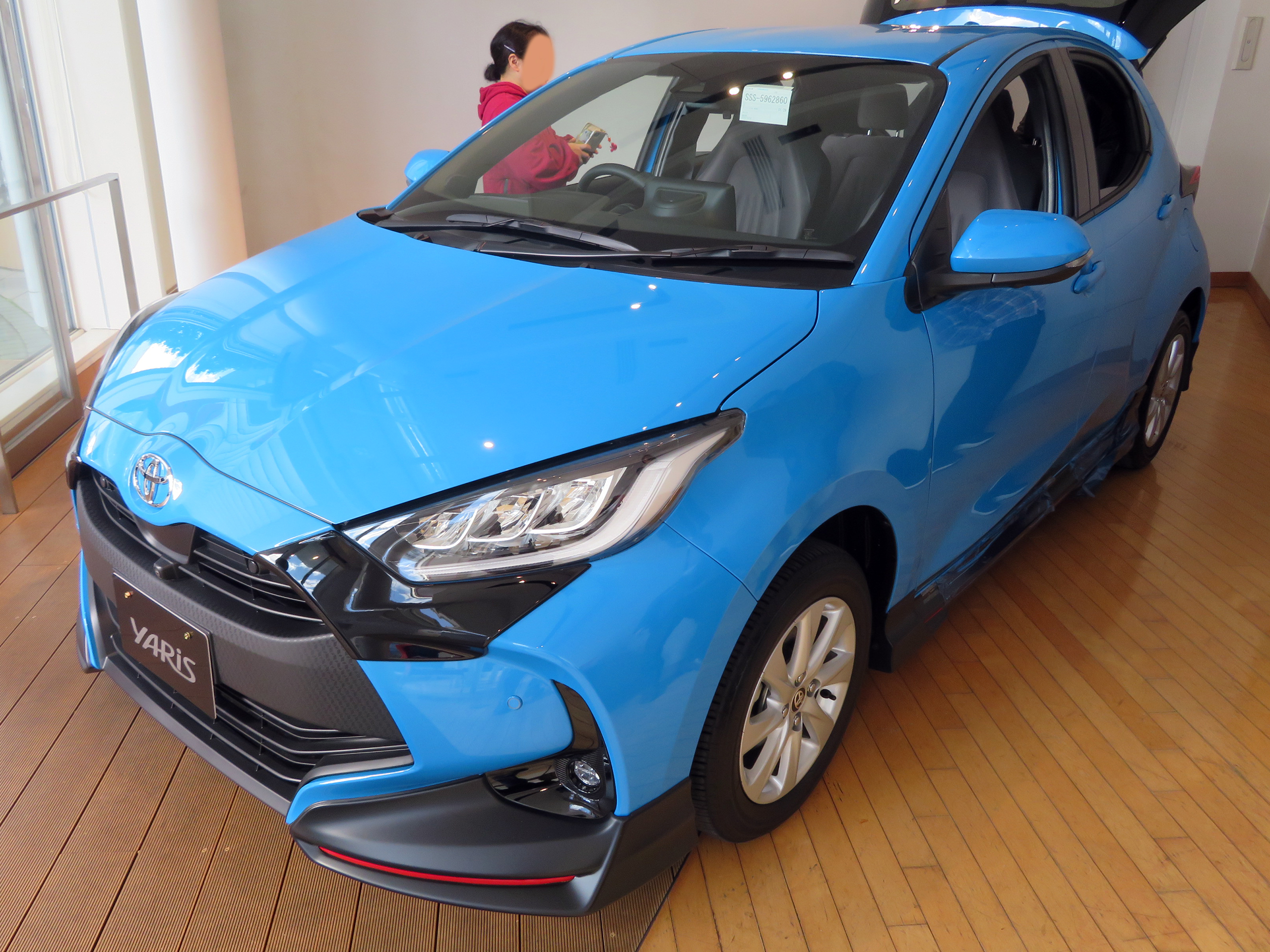
Toyota Yaris G (with optional GR-Parts)

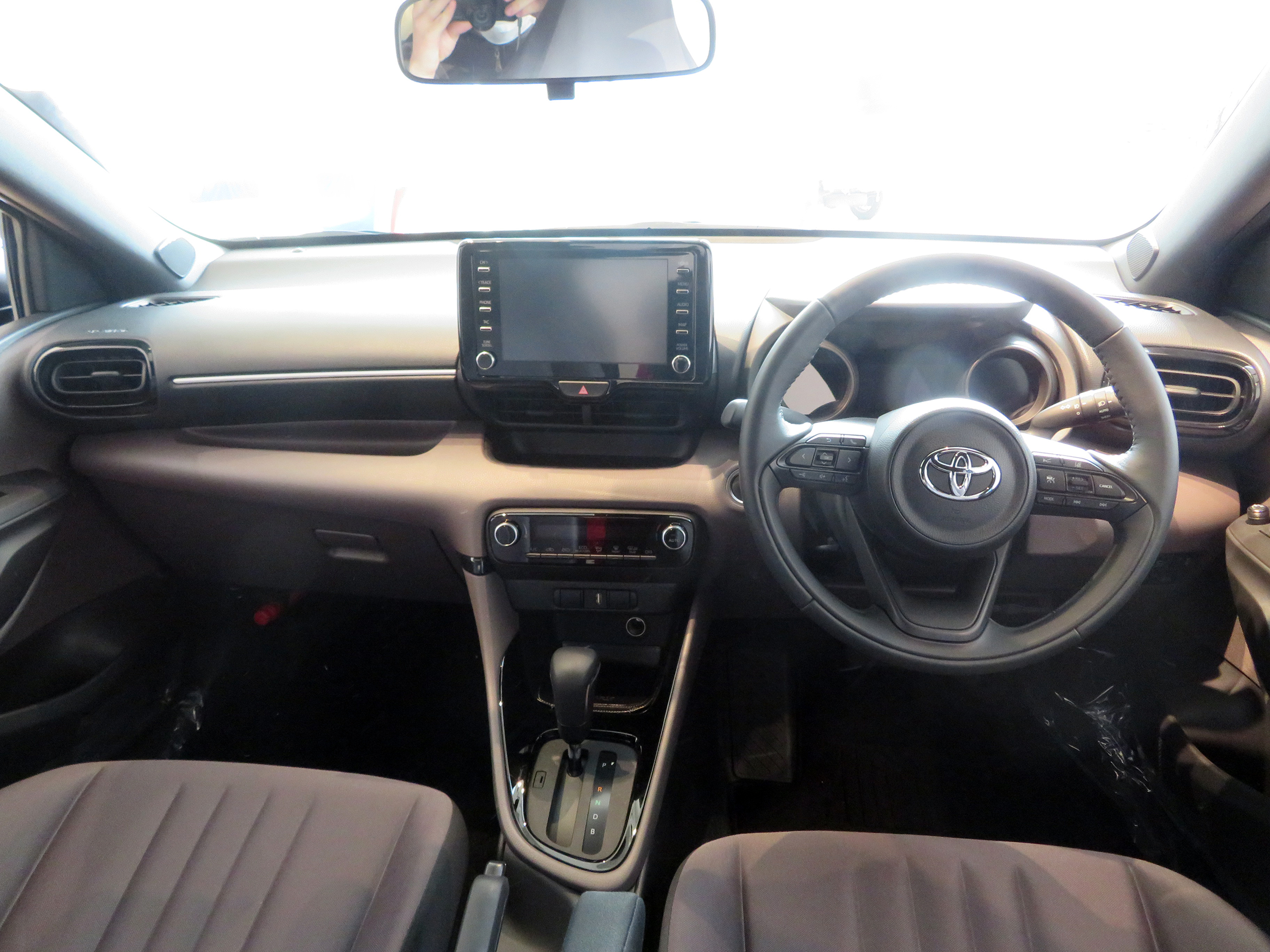
Interior (Japan)

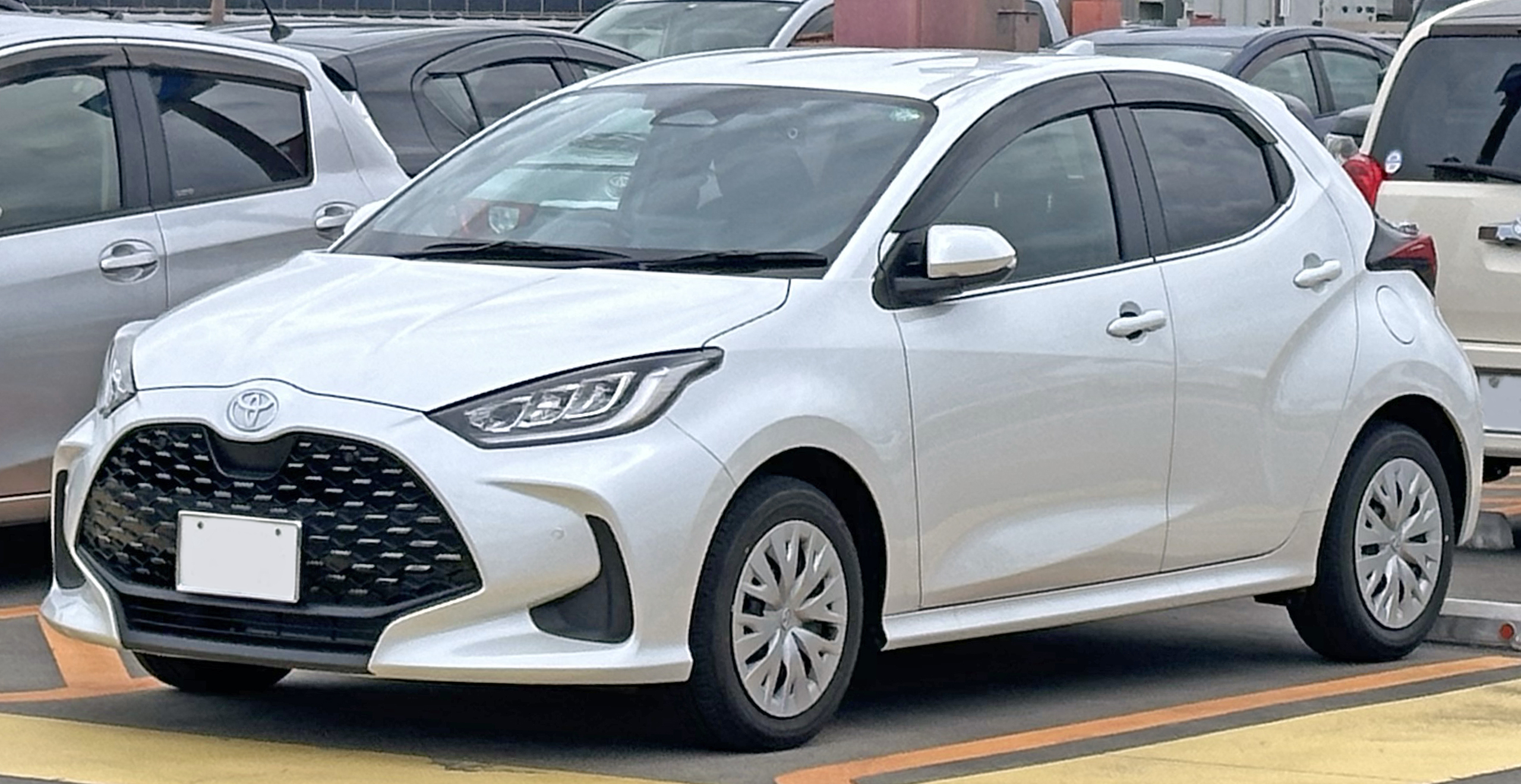
2024 Facelift Toyota Yaris Z (MXPA10, Japan)

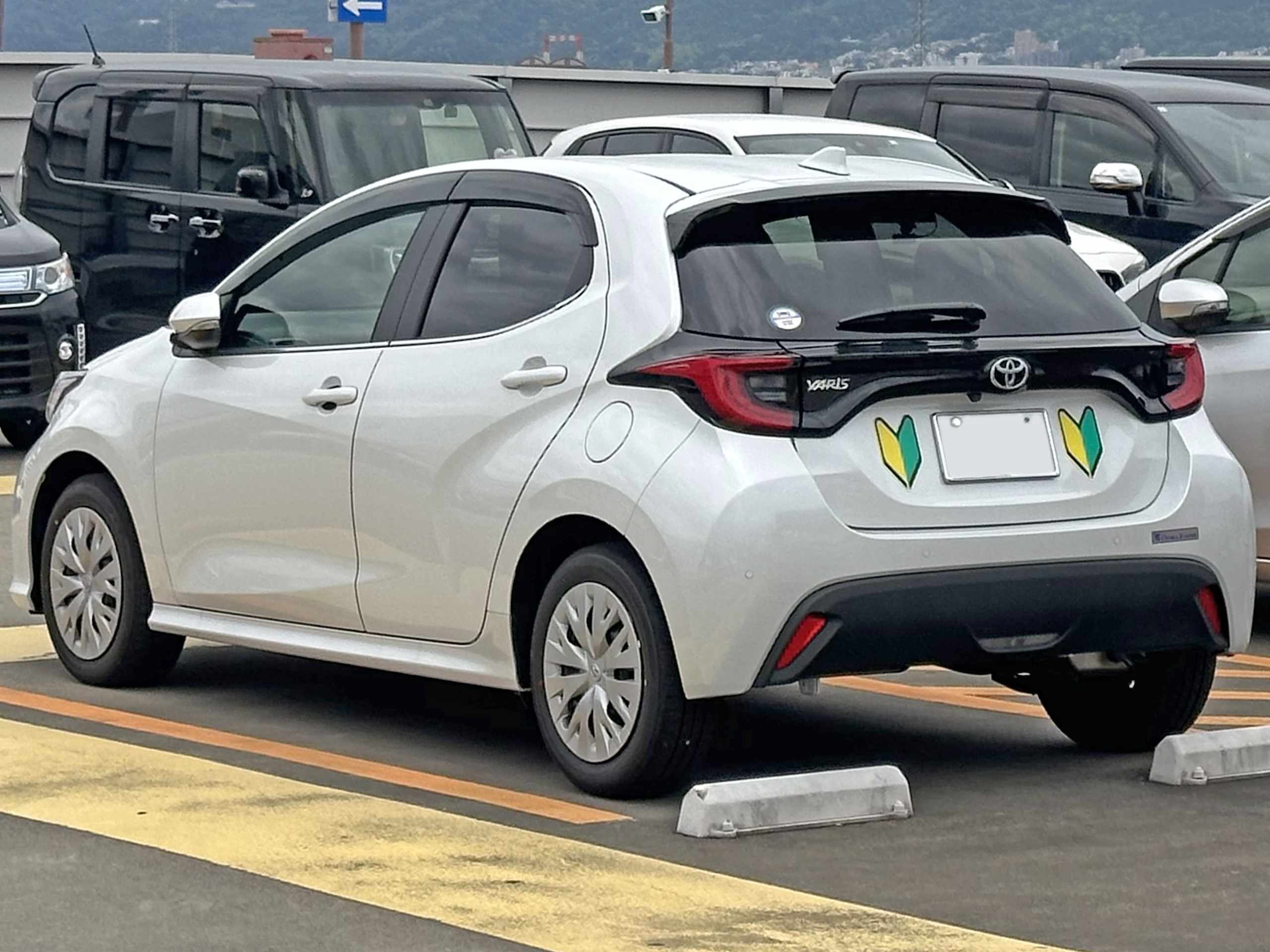
2024 Facelift Toyota Yaris Hybrid Z (MXPH14, Japan)

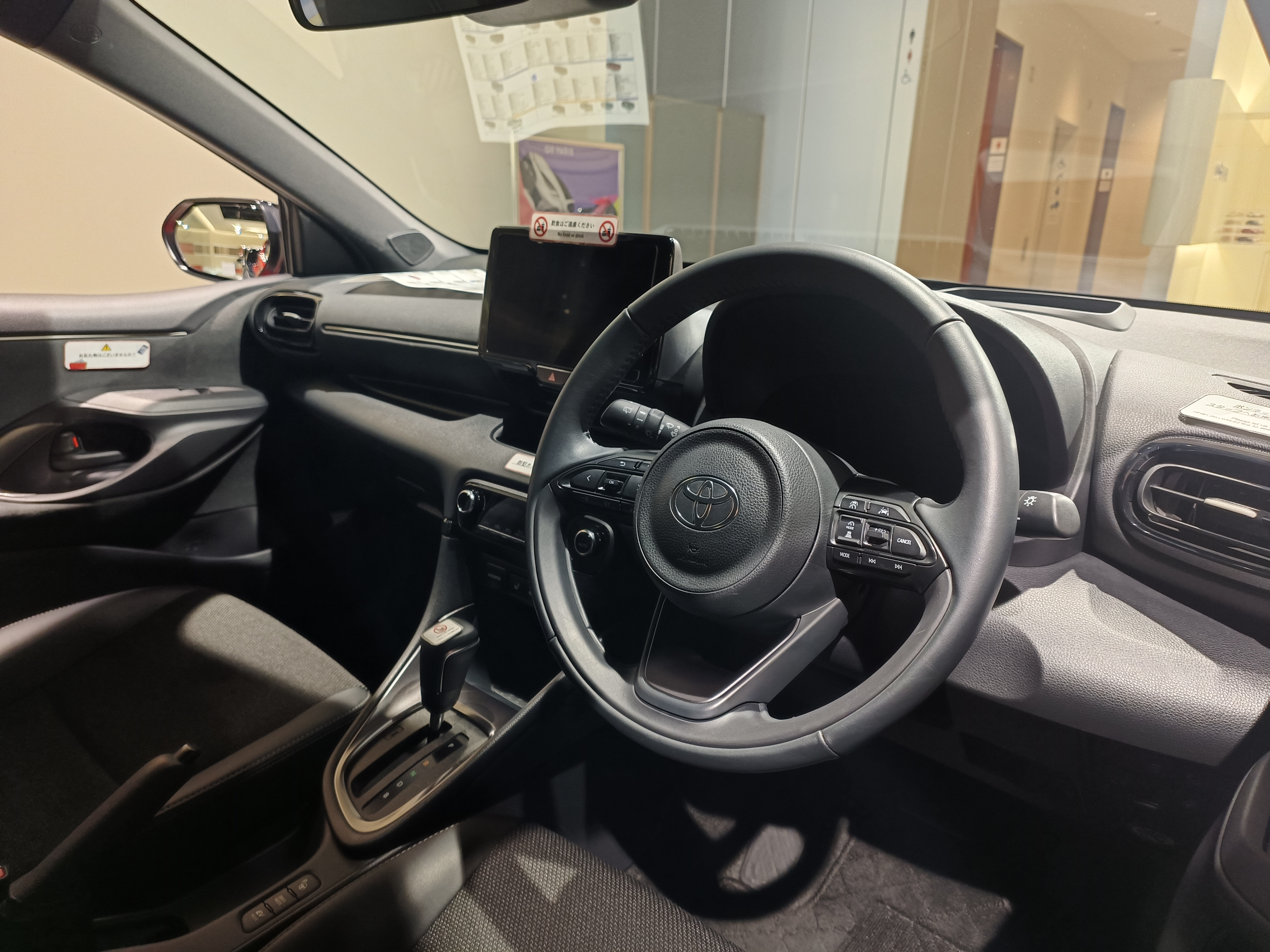
Interior (facelift, MXPH14, Japan)

=== Australasia ===
The XP210 series Yaris was revealed for Australia and New Zealand in June 2020, with sales starting from August 2020. Sourced from Japan, the Yaris for these markets received the 1.5-litre petrol engine both in conventional and hybrid configuration, with the latter being positioned as the replacement to the Prius c(Aqua). The Australian line-up consists of three trim levels, which are Ascent Sport, SX and ZR.

Non-hybrid Yaris hatchbacks were no longer offered in Australia since March 2024.

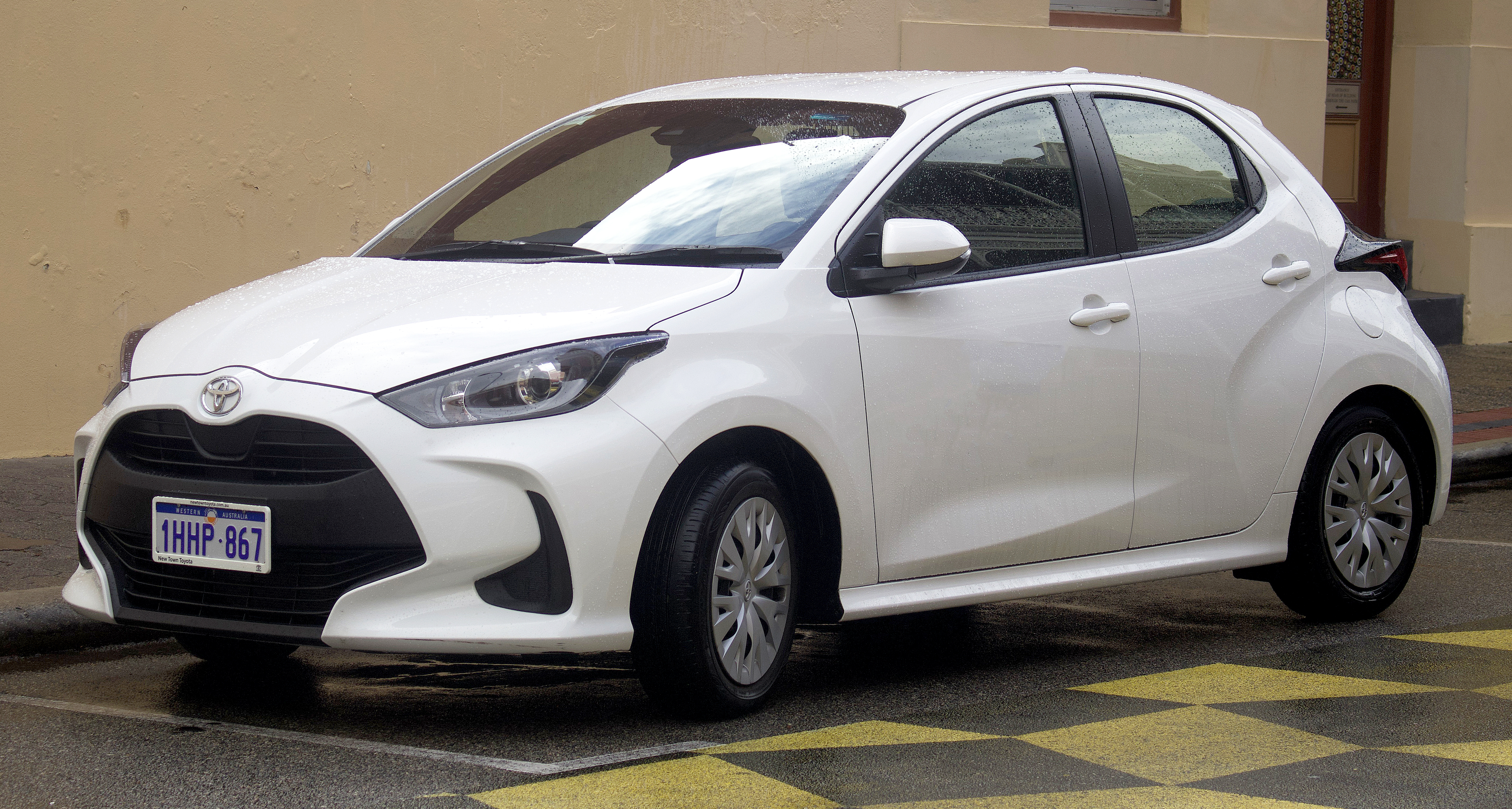
2021 Yaris Ascent (MXPA10, Australia)

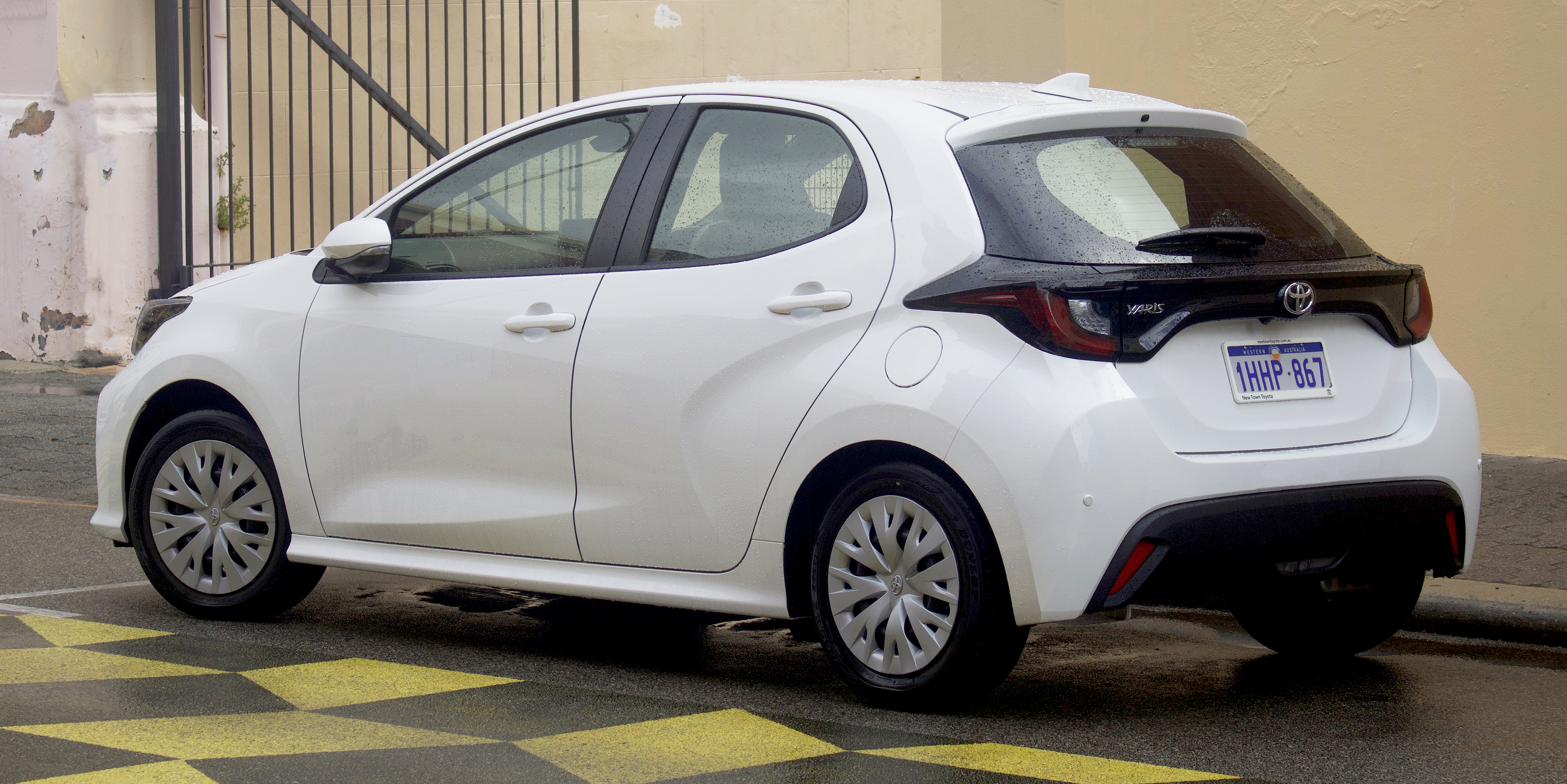
2021 Yaris Ascent (MXPA10, Australia)

=== Europe ===
For the European market, specifications were detailed in July 2020. It is available with the 1.5-litre petrol hybrid engine, while certain markets in the region also received the 1.0-litre and 1.5-litre conventional petrol engines. Production commenced at Toyota Motor Manufacturing France in Onnaing since 6 July 2020. It is also produced by Toyota Motor Manufacturing Czech Republic in Kolín since November 2021.

In August 2021, a two-seater van version of the Yaris Hybrid was released in Spain as the Yaris Hybrid ECOVan.

In December 2021, the GR Sport trim was introduced. This includes revised suspension tunings, increased body rigidity, and electric power steering readjustment.

An uprated 1.5-litre petrol hybrid engine option with a combined system output of 96 kW (129 hp; 131 PS) was made available on 30 May 2023, marketed as the 'Hybrid 130' while the older hybrid option was named 'Hybrid 115'.

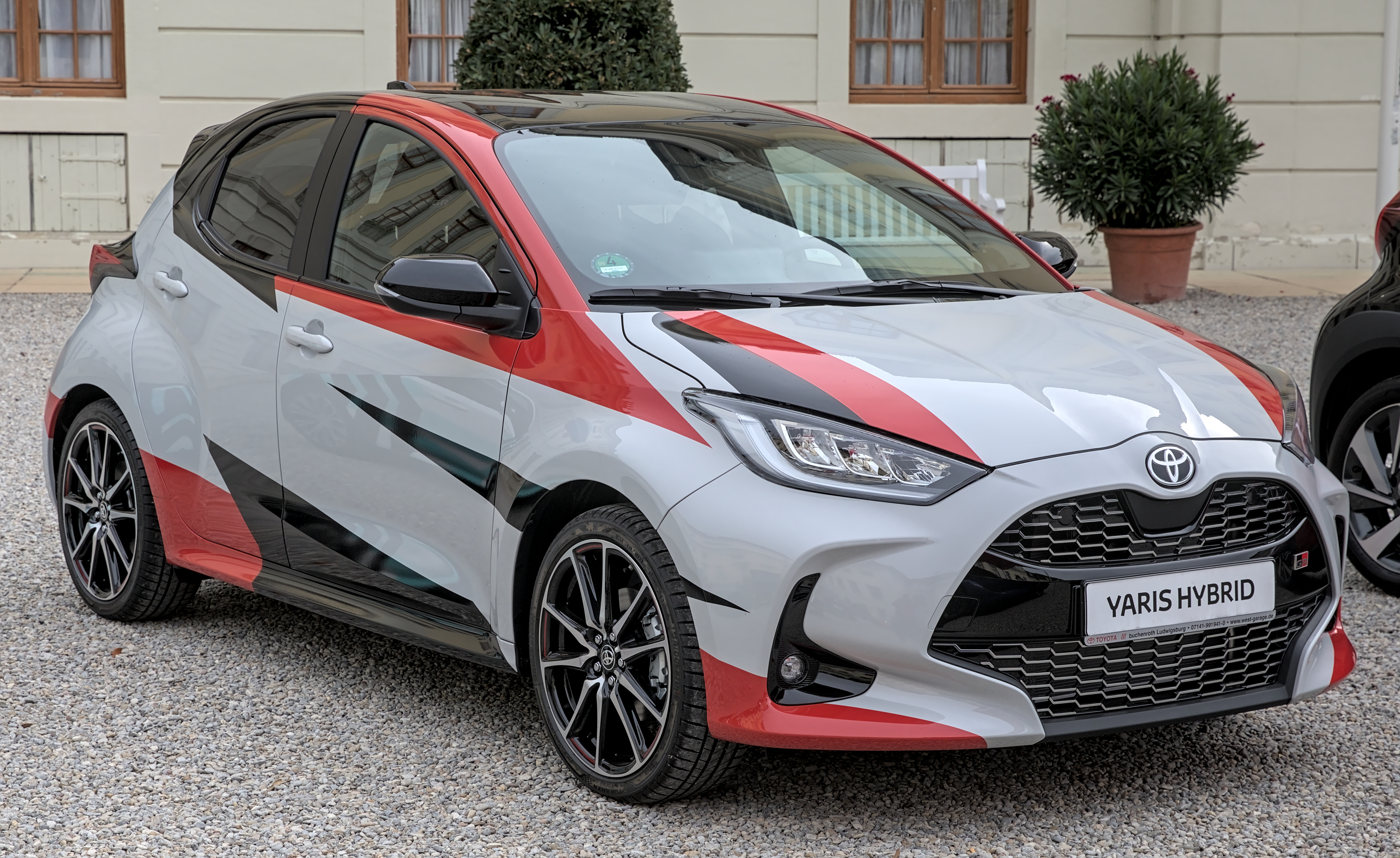
Yaris GR Sport Hybrid (MXPH11, Germany)

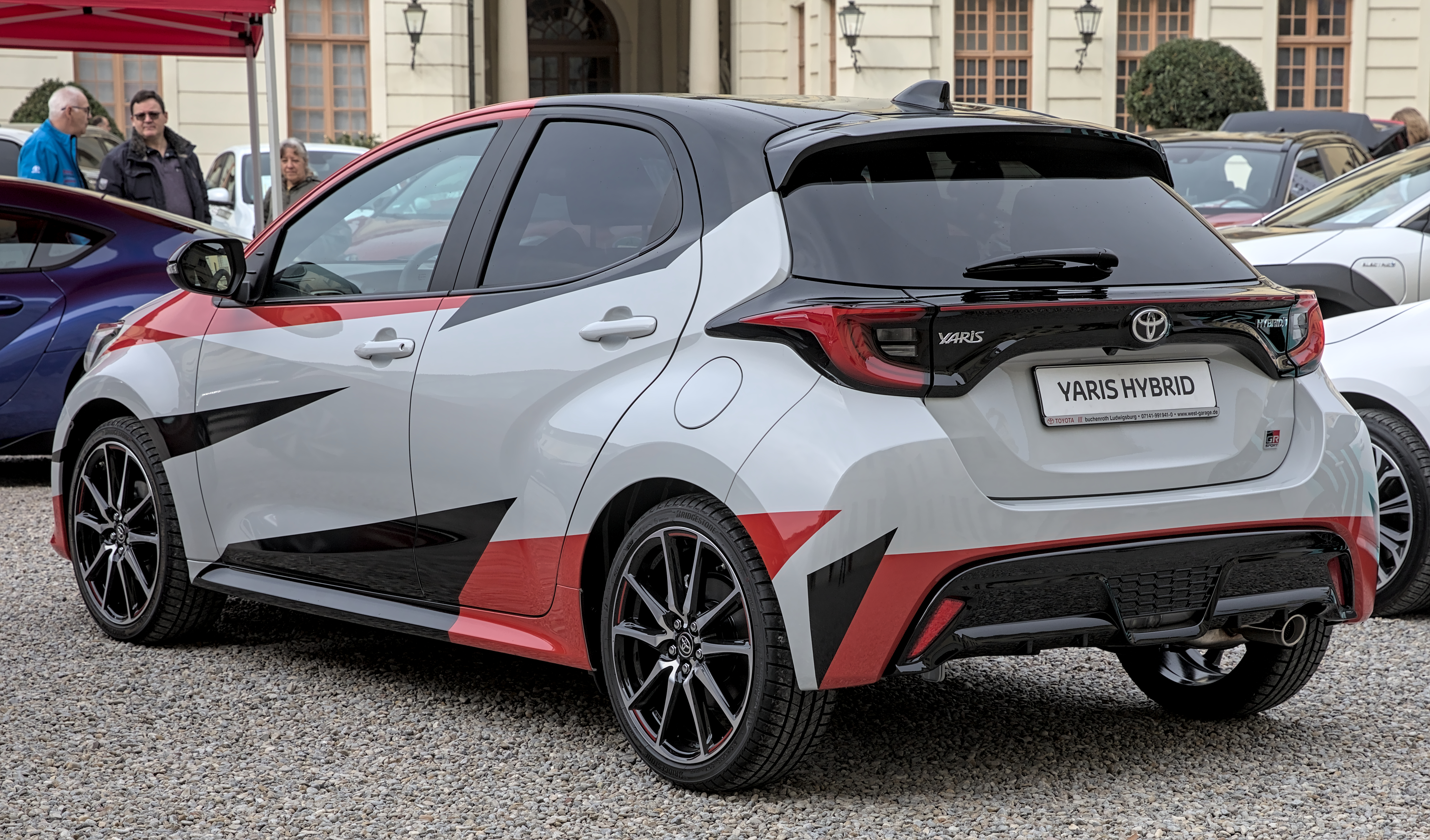
Yaris GR Sport Hybrid (MXPH11, Germany)

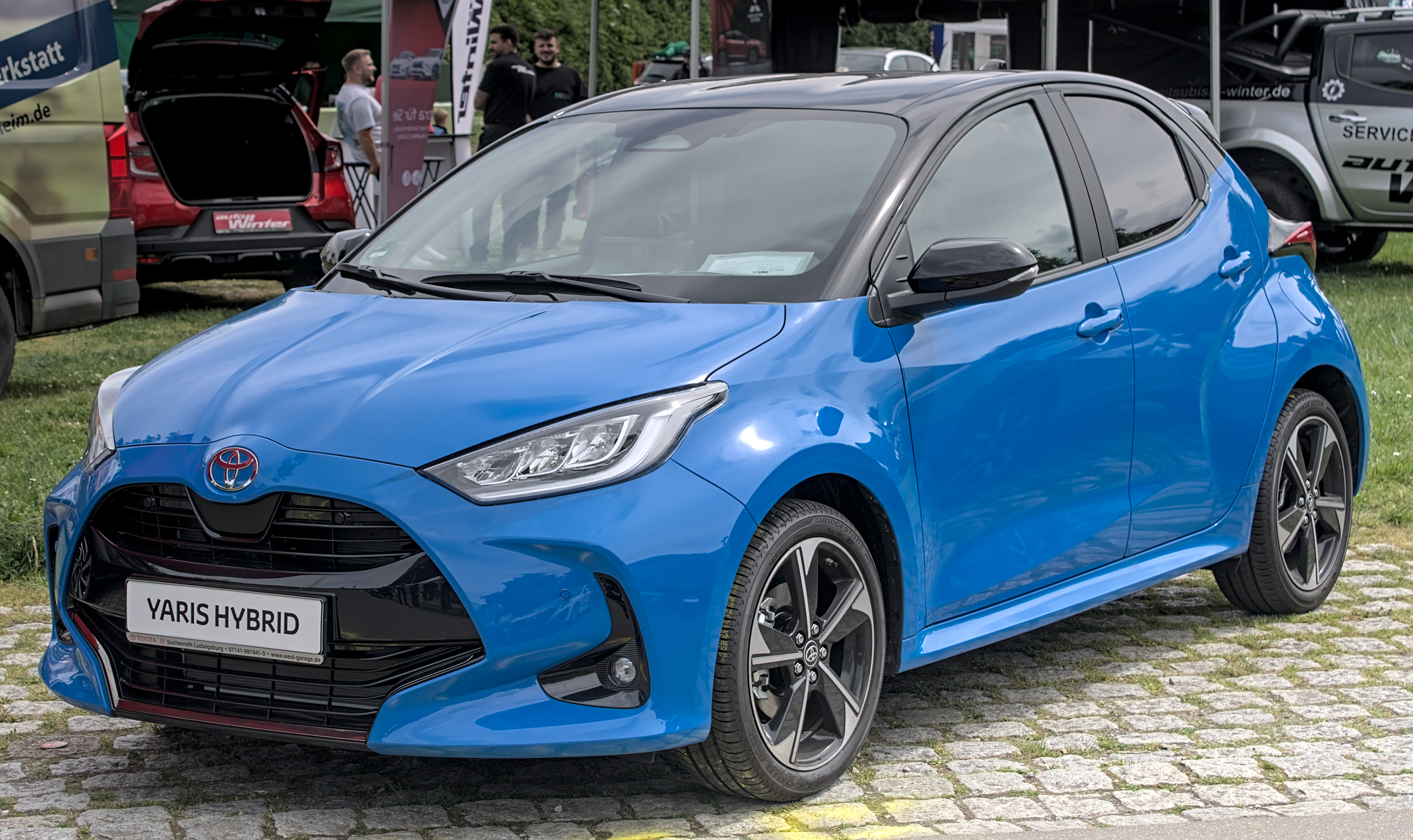
Yaris Hybrid 130 (2023 refresh)

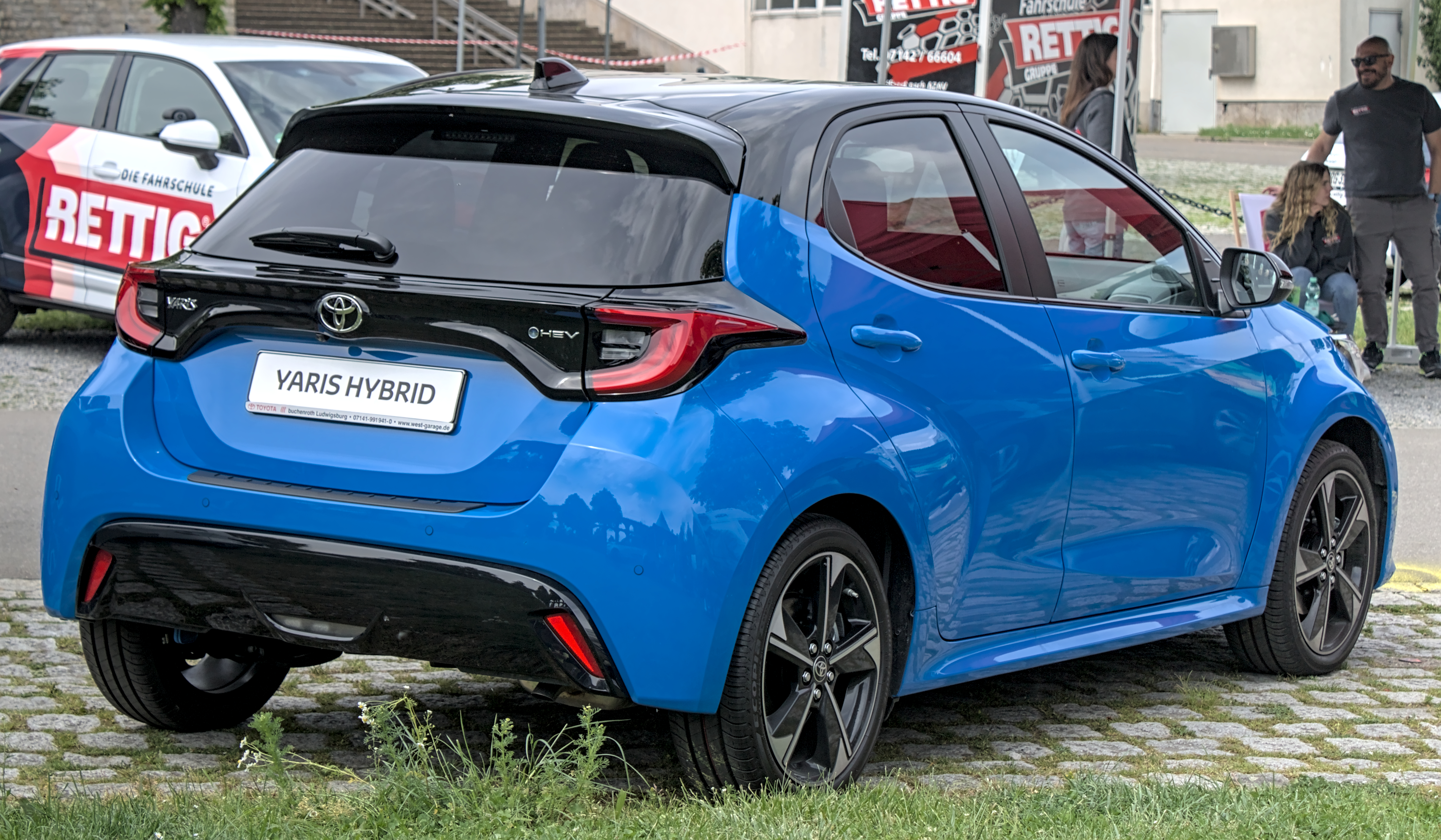
Yaris Hybrid 130 (2023 refresh)

== Mazda 2 Hybrid ==
The Yaris Hybrid-based Mazda2 Hybrid has been produced from December 2021 and went on sale in 2022 alongside the older Mazda-built, regular petrol-powered DJ model.

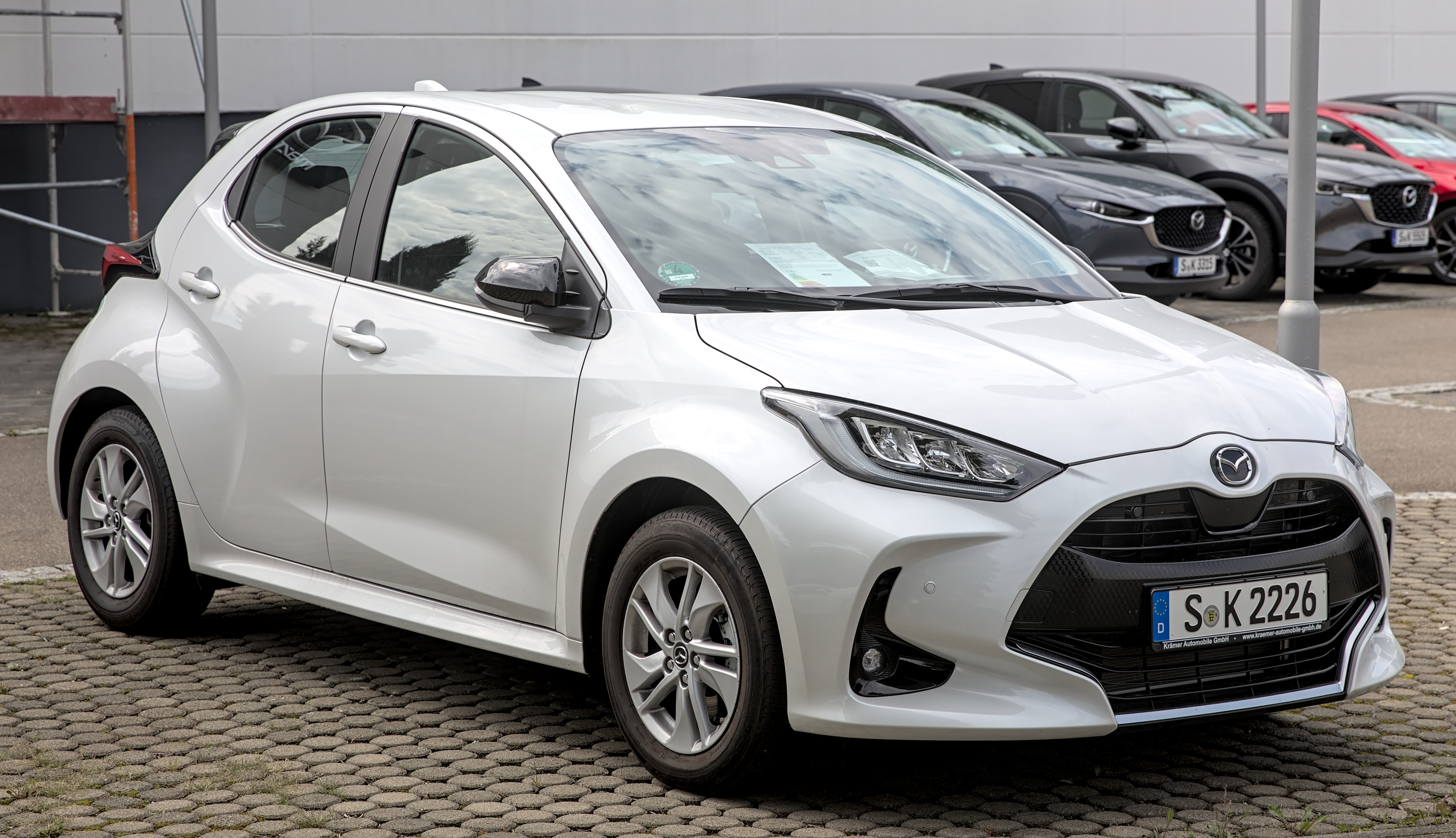
2022 Mazda2 Hybrid (pre-facelift)

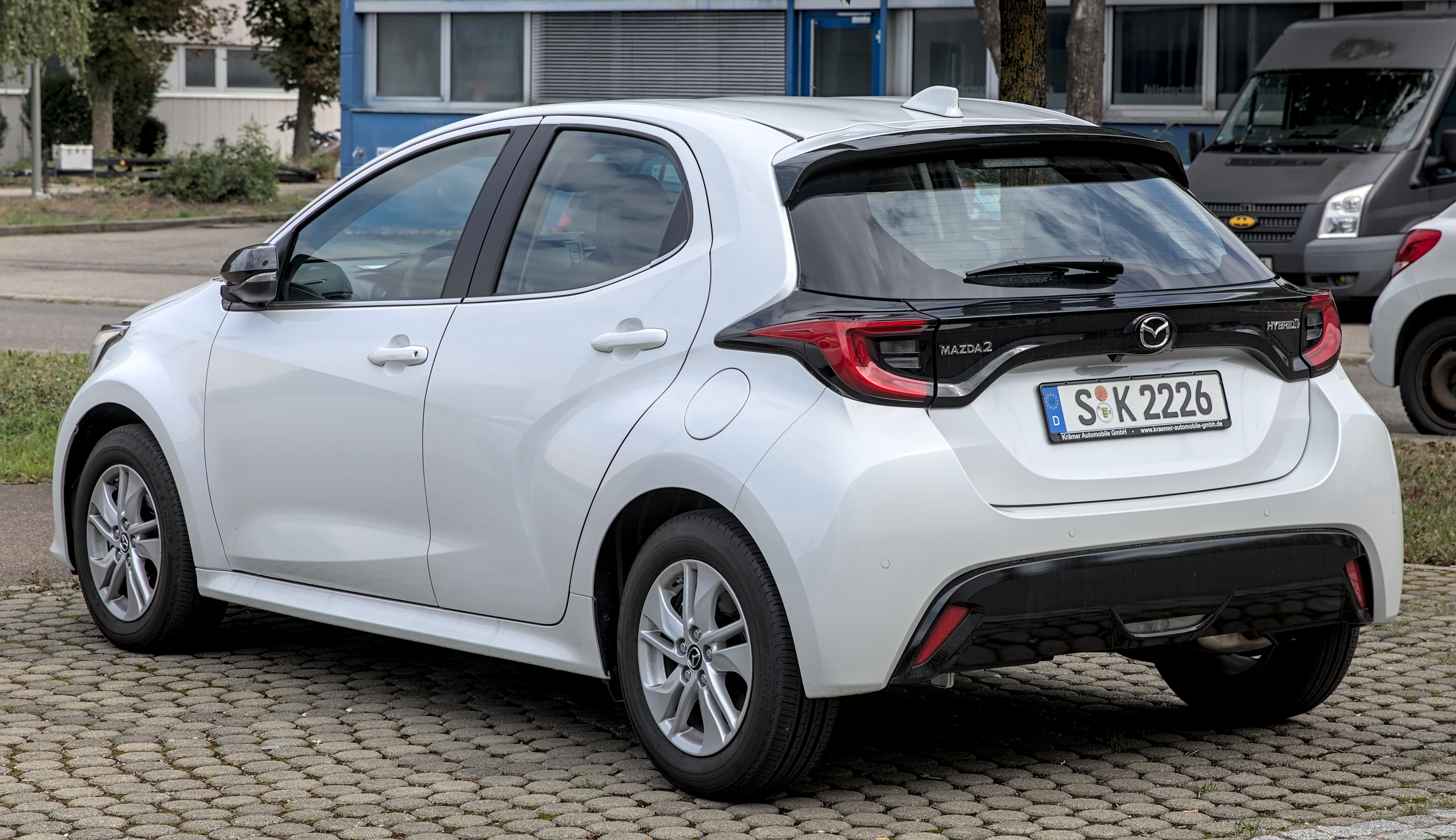
Rear view (pre-facelift)

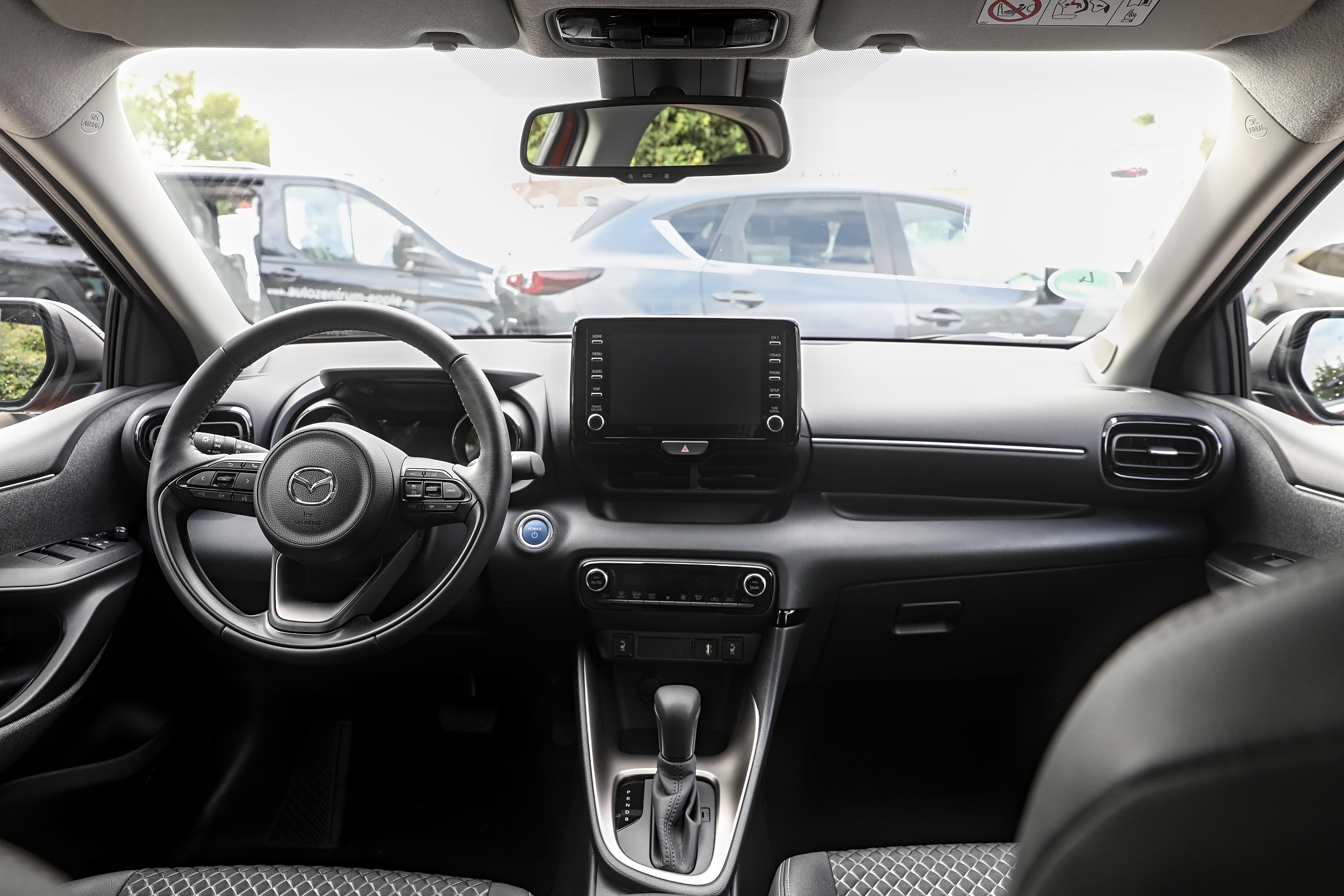
Interior (pre-facelift)

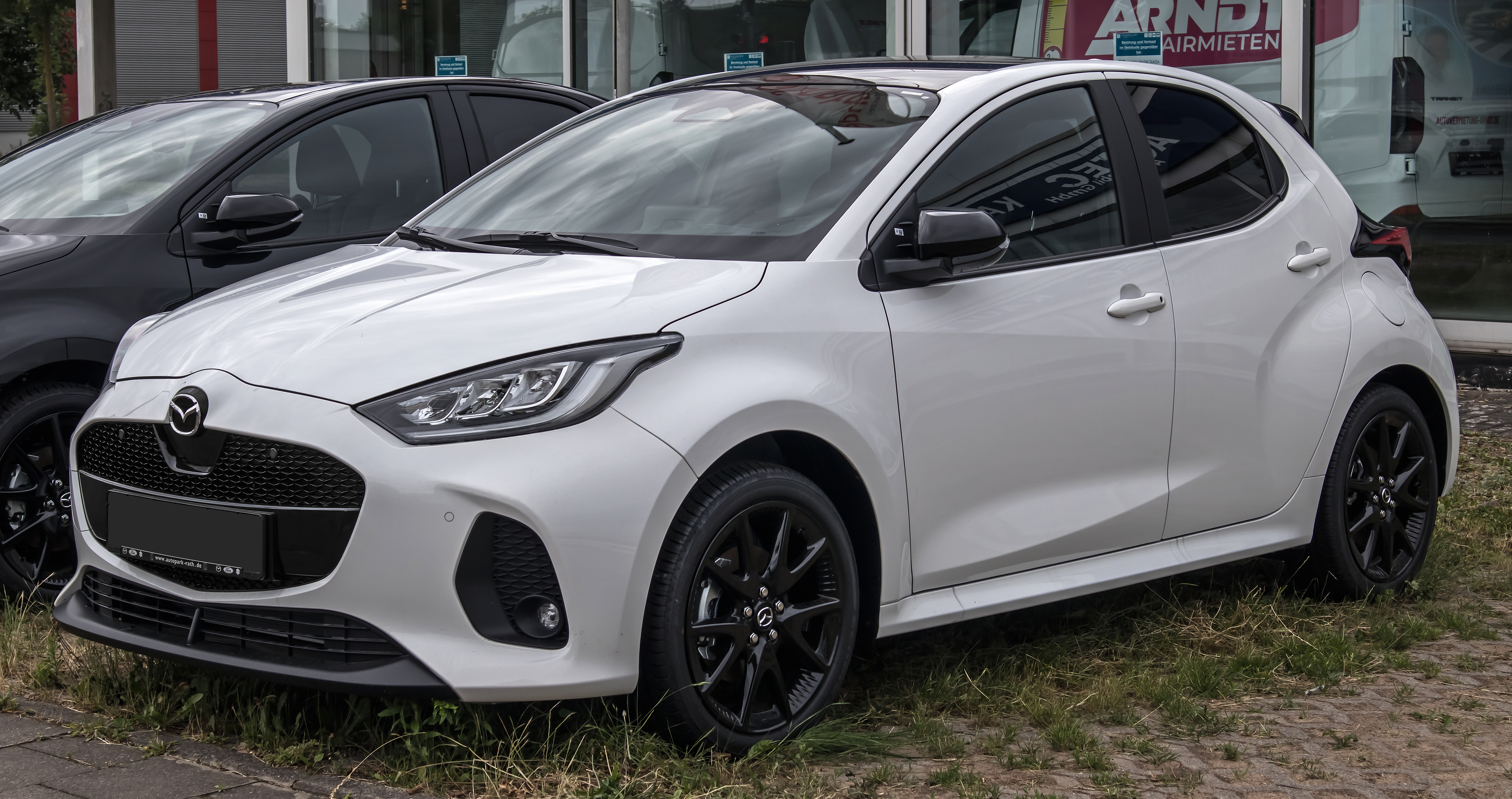
2025 Mazda2 Hybrid (facelift)

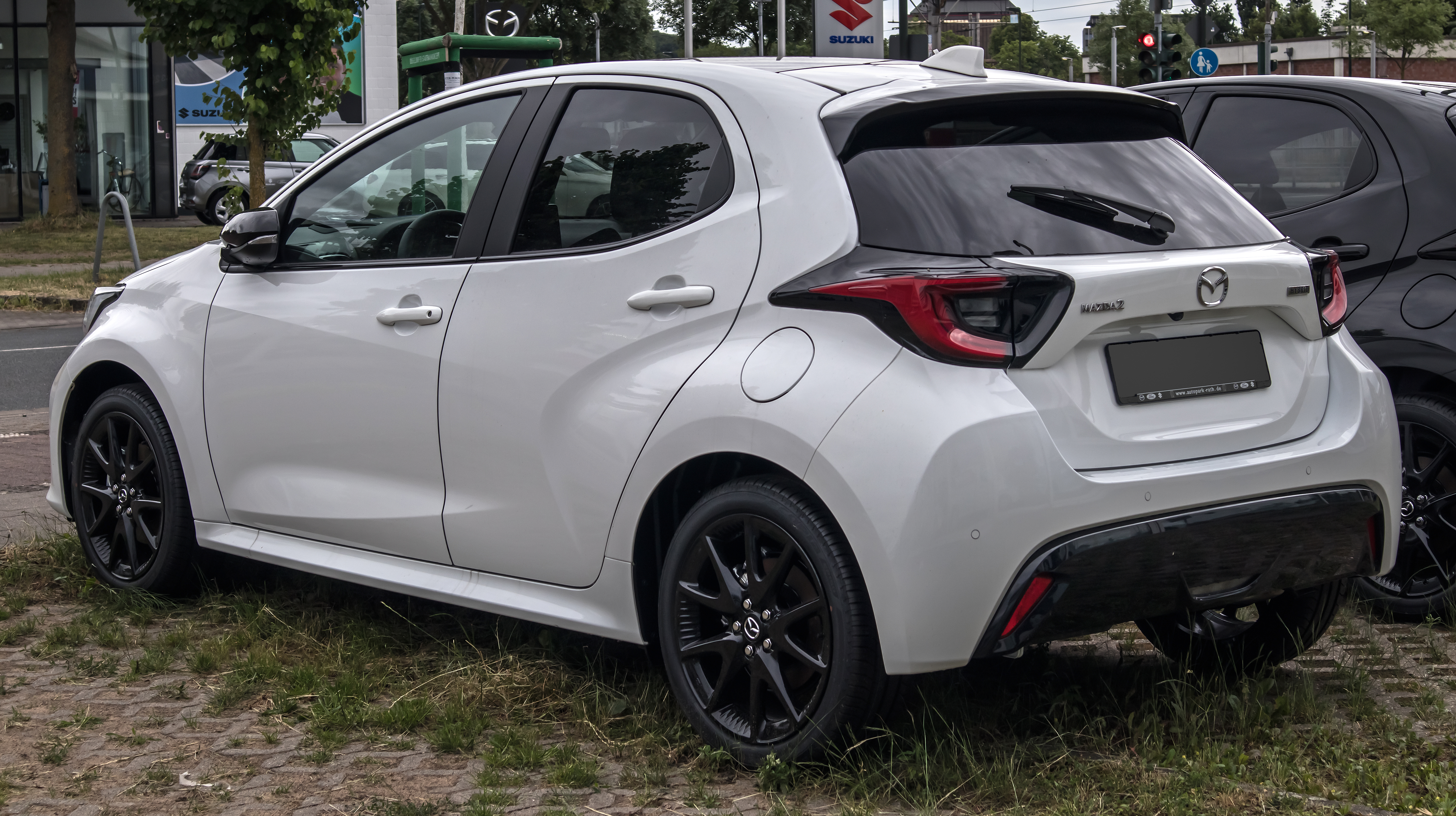
Rear view (facelift)

== Powertrain ==
Type	Engine code	Displ.	Power	Torque	Combined system output	Electric motor	Battery	Transmission	Model code	Layout	Cal. years
Petrol	1KR-FE	996 cc (1.0 L) I3	51 kW (68 hp; 69 PS) @ 6,000 rpm	92 N⋅m (9.38 kg⋅m; 67.9 lb⋅ft) @ 4,400 rpm	-	-	-	K120 CVT	KSP210 (Japan)	FWD	2020–present
Petrol	1KR-FE	996 cc (1.0 L) I3	53 kW (71 hp; 72 PS) @ 6,000 rpm	93 N⋅m (9.48 kg⋅m; 68.6 lb⋅ft) @ 4,400 rpm	-	-	-	5-speed manual	KSP211 (Europe)	FWD	2020–present
Petrol	M15A-FKS	1,490 cc (1.5 L) I3	88–92 kW (118–123 hp; 120–125 PS) @ 6,600 rpm	153 N⋅m (15.6 kg⋅m; 113 lb⋅ft) @ 4,800–5,000 rpm	-	-	-	6-speed manual; K120 CVT	MXPA11 (Europe)	FWD	2020–present
Petrol	M15A-FKS	1,490 cc (1.5 L) I3	88 kW (118 hp; 120 PS) @ 6,600 rpm	145 N⋅m (14.8 kg⋅m; 107 lb⋅ft) @ 4,800–5,200 rpm	-	-	-	6-speed manual; K120 CVT	MXPA10	FWD	2020–present
Petrol	M15A-FKS	1,490 cc (1.5 L) I3	88 kW (118 hp; 120 PS) @ 6,600 rpm	145 N⋅m (14.8 kg⋅m; 107 lb⋅ft) @ 4,800–5,200 rpm	-	-	-	K120 CVT	MXPA15 (Japan)	AWD	2020–present
Petrol hybrid	M15A-FXE	1,490 cc (1.5 L) I3	Engine: 67–68 kW (90–91 hp; 91–92 PS) @ 5,500 rpm Front motor: 59 kW (79 hp; 80 PS)	Engine: 120 N⋅m (12.2 kg⋅m; 88.5 lb⋅ft) @ 3,600–4,800 rpm Front motor: 141 N⋅m (14.4 kg⋅m; 104 lb⋅ft)	85 kW (114 hp; 116 PS)	1NM AC synchronous (front)	177.6 V lithium-ion	eCVT	MXPH11 (Europe)	FWD	2020–present
Petrol hybrid	M15A-FXE	1,490 cc (1.5 L) I3	Engine: 67–68 kW (90–91 hp; 91–92 PS) @ 5,500 rpm Front motor: 59 kW (79 hp; 80 PS)	Engine: 120 N⋅m (12.2 kg⋅m; 88.5 lb⋅ft) @ 3,600–4,800 rpm Front motor: 141 N⋅m (14.4 kg⋅m; 104 lb⋅ft)	85 kW (114 hp; 116 PS)	1NM AC synchronous (front)	177.6 V lithium-ion	eCVT	MXPH10	FWD	2020–present
Petrol hybrid	M15A-FXE	1,490 cc (1.5 L) I3	+ Rear motor: 3.9 kW (5.2 hp; 5.3 PS)	+ Rear motor: 52 N⋅m (5.3 kg⋅m; 38 lb⋅ft)	85 kW (114 hp; 116 PS)	+ 1MM AC synchronous (rear)	177.6 V lithium-ion	eCVT	MXPH15 (Japan)	AWD E-Four	2020–present
Petrol hybrid	M15A-FXE	1,490 cc (1.5 L) I3	Engine: 68 kW (91 hp; 92 PS) @ 5,500 rpm Front motor: 62 kW (83 hp; 84 PS)	Engine: 120 N⋅m (12.2 kg⋅m; 88.5 lb⋅ft) @ 3,600–4,800 rpm Motor: 185 N⋅m (18.9 kg⋅m; 136 lb⋅ft)	96 kW (129 hp; 131 PS)			eCVT		FWD	2023–present (Europe, Hybrid 130)

== Safety ==
In Europe, the fourth-generation Yaris is the first car to be tested with all-new frontal offset test and counter-measure for injuries in far-side impacts by a "mobile progressive deformable barrier" (MPDB) test. It is also the first Toyota to come with centre airbags. It received five stars out of a possible five from ANCAP and Euro NCAP.

ANCAP test results Toyota Yaris all variants excluding GR Yaris & GR Yaris Rallye (2020, aligned with Euro NCAP)
Test	Points	%
Overall:	5 /5 stars	
Adult occupant:	32.97	86%
Child occupant:	42.97	87%
Pedestrian:	42.29	78%
Safety assist:	13.95	87%

Euro NCAP test results Toyota Yaris (2020)
Test	Points	%
Overall:	5 /5 stars	
Adult occupant:	33.0	86%
Child occupant:	40.0	81%
Pedestrian:	42.3	78%
Safety assist:	13.7	85%

Euro NCAP test results Toyota Yaris (2025)
Test	Points	%
Overall:	4 /5 stars	
Adult occupant:	29.1	72%
Child occupant:	41.2	84%
Pedestrian:	52.8	83%
Safety assist:	13.0	72%

== Awards ==
The fourth-generation Yaris was awarded as the 2021 European Car of the Year.

Preceded by Vitz	Toyota Yaris (Japanese market); 2019–present	Succeeded by N/A
