= Toyota Motor Manufacturing Russia =

Former Russian car manufacturing factory

- Type: Subsidiary
- Industry: Automotive
- Founded: 14 June 2005; 21 years ago
- Defunct: 23 September 2022; 4 years ago
- Headquarters: Shushary, Saint Petersburg, Russia
- Area served: Europe
- Products: Automobiles
- Owner: Toyota Motor Corporation
- Parent: Toyota Motor Europe
- Website: toyota.ru

Toyota Motor Manufacturing Russia was one of Toyota's vehicle production bases in Europe. It was located in Shushary, Saint Petersburg, Russia, and it manufactured the Camry and the RAV4.

== History ==
On 14 June 2005, the construction of the new plant began and it opened on 21 December 2007 with the production of the sixth generation Toyota Camry. On August 22, 2016, the Toyota RAV4 started production as the second model to be produced at the Russia plant. On 1 March 2022, due to the Russian invasion of Ukraine, Toyota announced that their plant will close and all activity will be suspended. On 23 September 2022, Toyota officially closed the TMMR plant.

== Production ==
- Camry (2007–2022)
- RAV4 (2016–2022)
