= Toyota Motor Hokkaido =

Manufacturing subsidiary of Toyota

Toyota Motor Hokkaido, Inc.
- Native name: トヨタ自動車北海道
- Romanized name: Toyota Jidōsha Hokkaidō Kabushiki-gaisha
- Company type: Subsidiary
- Industry: Automotive
- Founded: February 8, 1991; 34 years ago
- Headquarters: Tomakomai, Japan
- Key people: Yasuo Hojo (President)
- Products: Transmissions, drivetrain-related parts, hybrid systems
- Parent: Toyota Motor Corporation
- Website: Official website

Toyota Motor Hokkaido (TMH) is a manufacturing subsidiary of Toyota established in 1991 and focuses on the production of transmissions and powertrain-related parts. Its headquarters and assembly plant are located in Tomakomai, Hokkaido.

== History ==
As part of Toyota's efforts to disperse production bases in Hokkaido, Tomakomai was chosen because of its vast land area, excellent logistics due to the Tomakomai Port, and the ability to procure aluminum locally.

IN 1990, Toyota announced it would open a facility in Tomakomai and Toyota Motor Hokkaido was established of February 8 the following year.

In 1992, production of aluminium wheels began, and continued until production ended in 2010.

In 1993, TMH began producing automatic transmission and the completion ceremony of the factory took place in the same year.

In 1999, it acquired "ISO 14001" certification. In 2001, TMH chieved zero emissions and started using liquified natural gas the following year.

In 2004, "Yuhokai", a business partner cooperative association was established. In 2005, the No. 4 factory (machine shop) was completed and the following year, TMH began producing continuously variable transmission (CVT).

In2008, the No. 5 factory (forging factory) completed.

In 2012, TMH began producing hybrid transaxles.
