= Toyota Motor Manufacturing France =

French automobile manufacturer

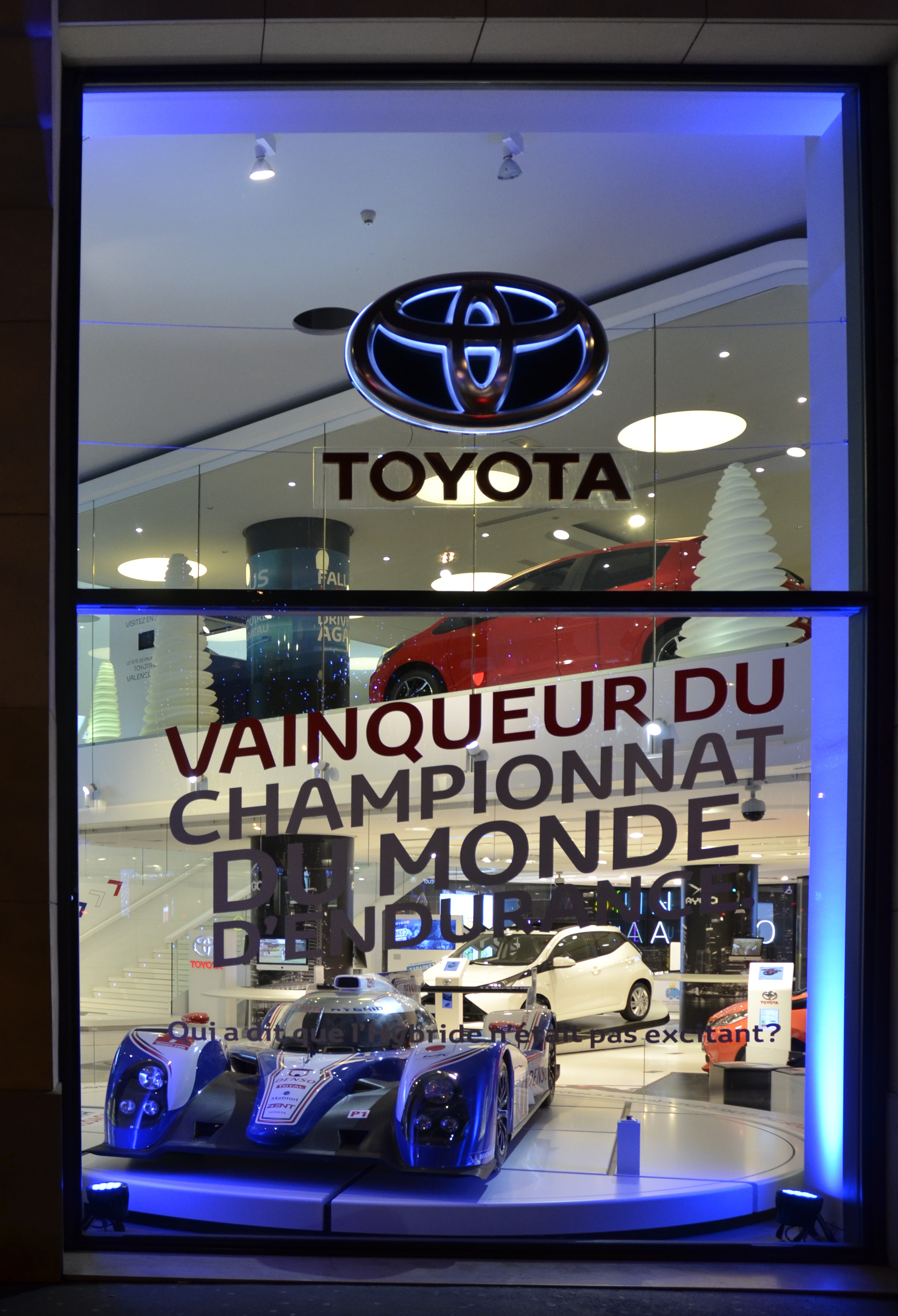
- Toyota showroom at Champs Elysées, Paris
- Company type: Société par actions simplifiée (subsidiary of Toyota)
- Industry: Automotive
- Founded: 1998; 28 years ago
- Headquarters: Onnaing, Nord-Pas-de-Calais, France
- Area served: Europe
- Products: Automobiles
- Revenue: 4,962,084,189 euro (2024)
- Owner: Toyota
- Number of employees: 3,732
- Parent: Toyota Europe
- Website: tmmf.toyota-europe.com

Toyota Motor Manufacturing France S.A.S., or better known under its acronym TMMF, is the French automobile manufacturing division of Japanese automaker Toyota located in Onnaing near the city of Valenciennes. The company was founded in 1998 as a subsidiary of Toyota Motor Europe N/V S/A.

The construction of the new plant began in 1999 and was completed one year later. The production started on 31 January 2001 with the small car Toyota Yaris. Both models were facelifted in 2003. With the launch of the second generation in 2005, the production of the Yaris Verso discontinued.

Since April 2002, the French plant is manufacturing D-4D turbo diesel engines with direct injection and common rail technology. A few months later the first D-CAT diesel engine were produced. In November, Toyota increased the production capacity of its French plant from 100,000 to 184,000 units per year. This necessitated the change to the three-shift operation. In July, the 500,000th Yaris left the factory. At the same time Toyota raised its annual production to 270,000 units a year. The millionth Yaris, already in second generation, was manufactured in December 2006 and in 2016 the three-millionth Yaris was produced.

Furthermore, the TMMF operates since September 2005 its own training centre known as the Centre de Formation. So the TMMF is one of the important regional training organizations in the Nord-Pas-de-Calais area. A total of 3,732 employees working on the 233 hectare site for the TMMF.

In May 2011, Toyota stopped production of the French Yaris model of the second generation which was replaced by the identical Daihatsu Charade. However, the official successor is the Toyota Yaris of the third generation which is also manufactured in France.

In June 2012, Toyota announced that it would move production of the Toyota Yaris for the North American market from Japan to France. The company expects annual exports to total 25,000 units.

For seven years, the Yaris was the most produced car in France. In 2022, 2023 and 2024, the Yaris Cross took over its position.

== Current production ==
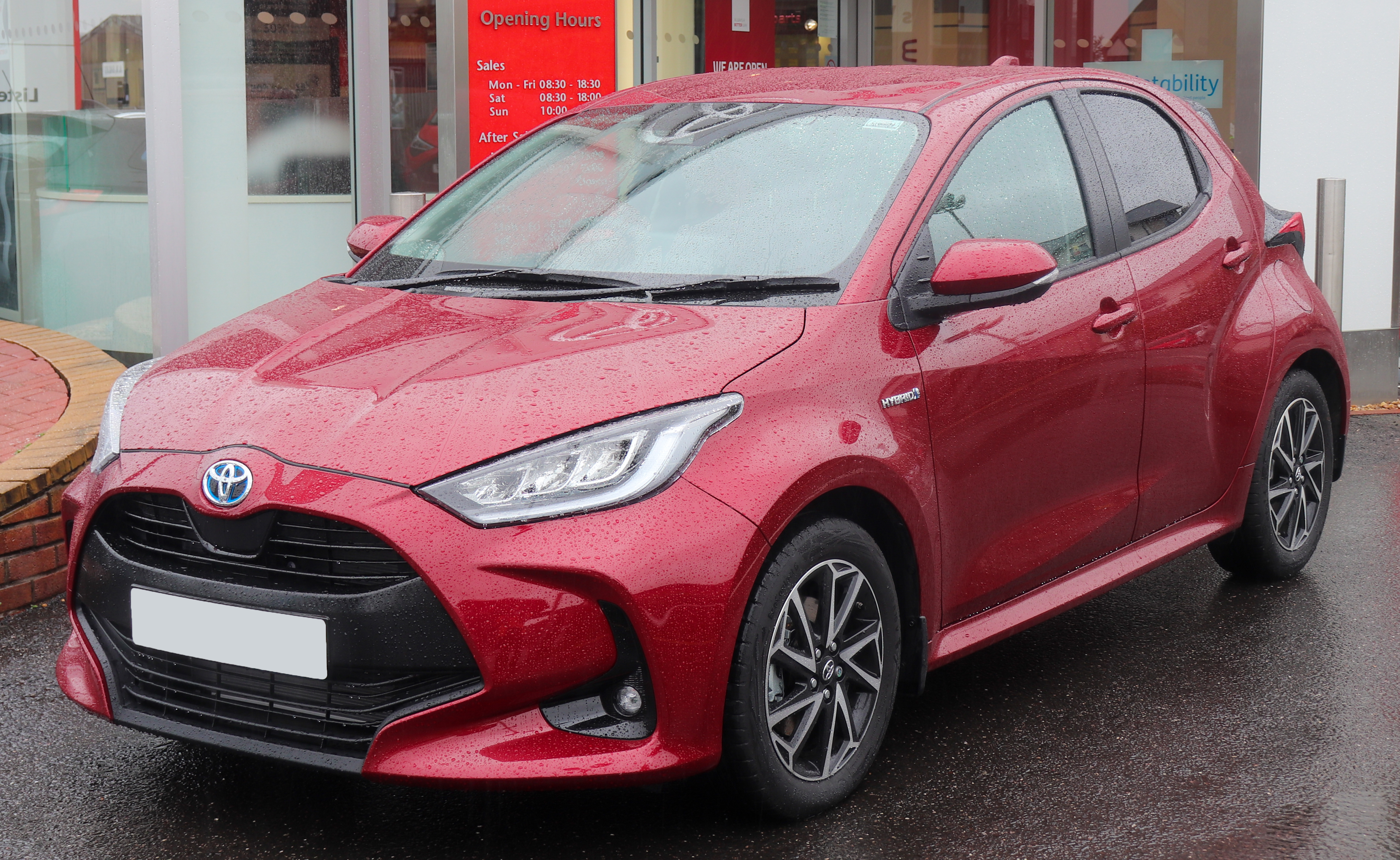
Toyota Yaris (XP210)
July 2020 – present

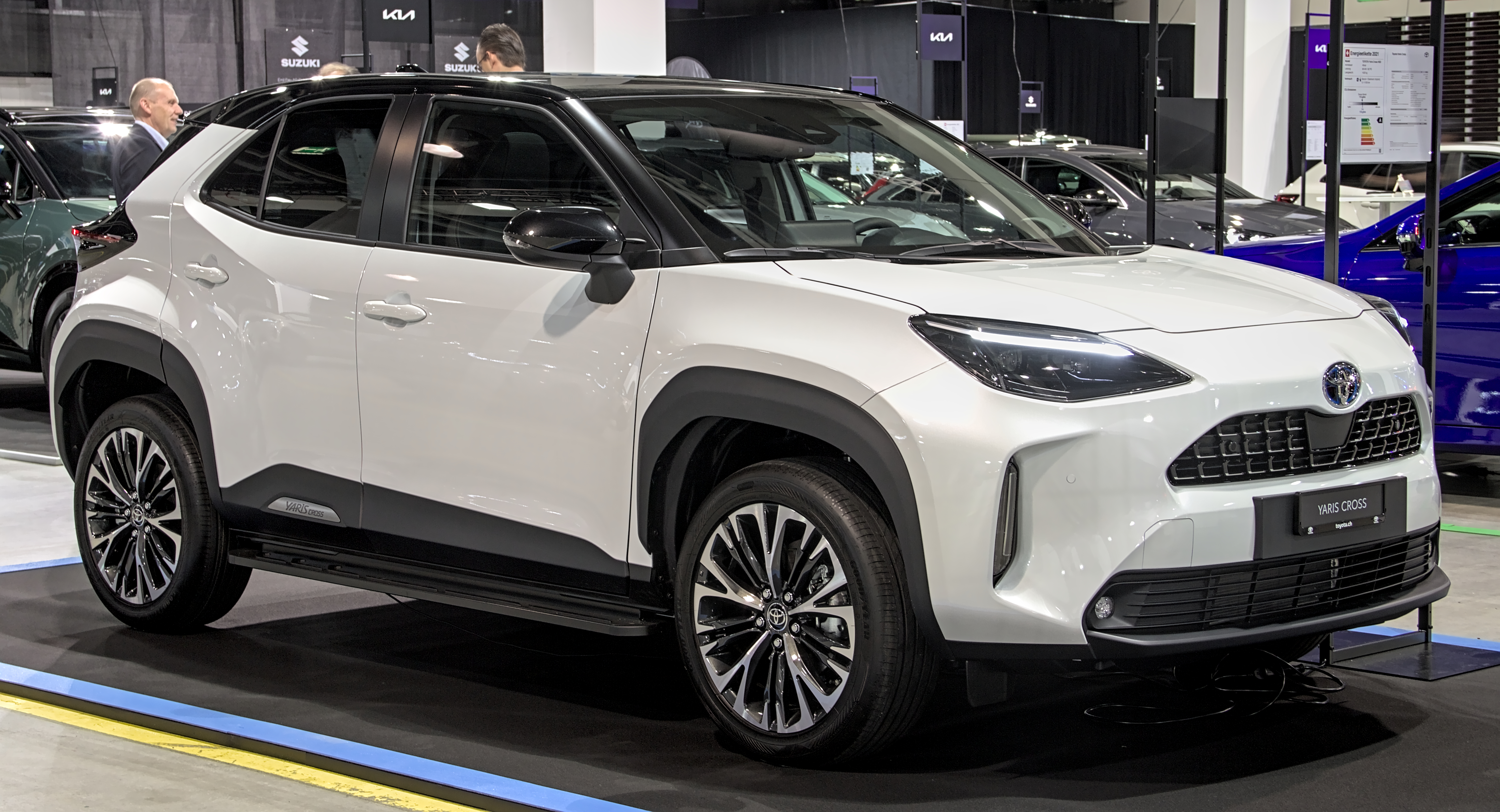
Toyota Yaris Cross (XP210)
July 2021 – present

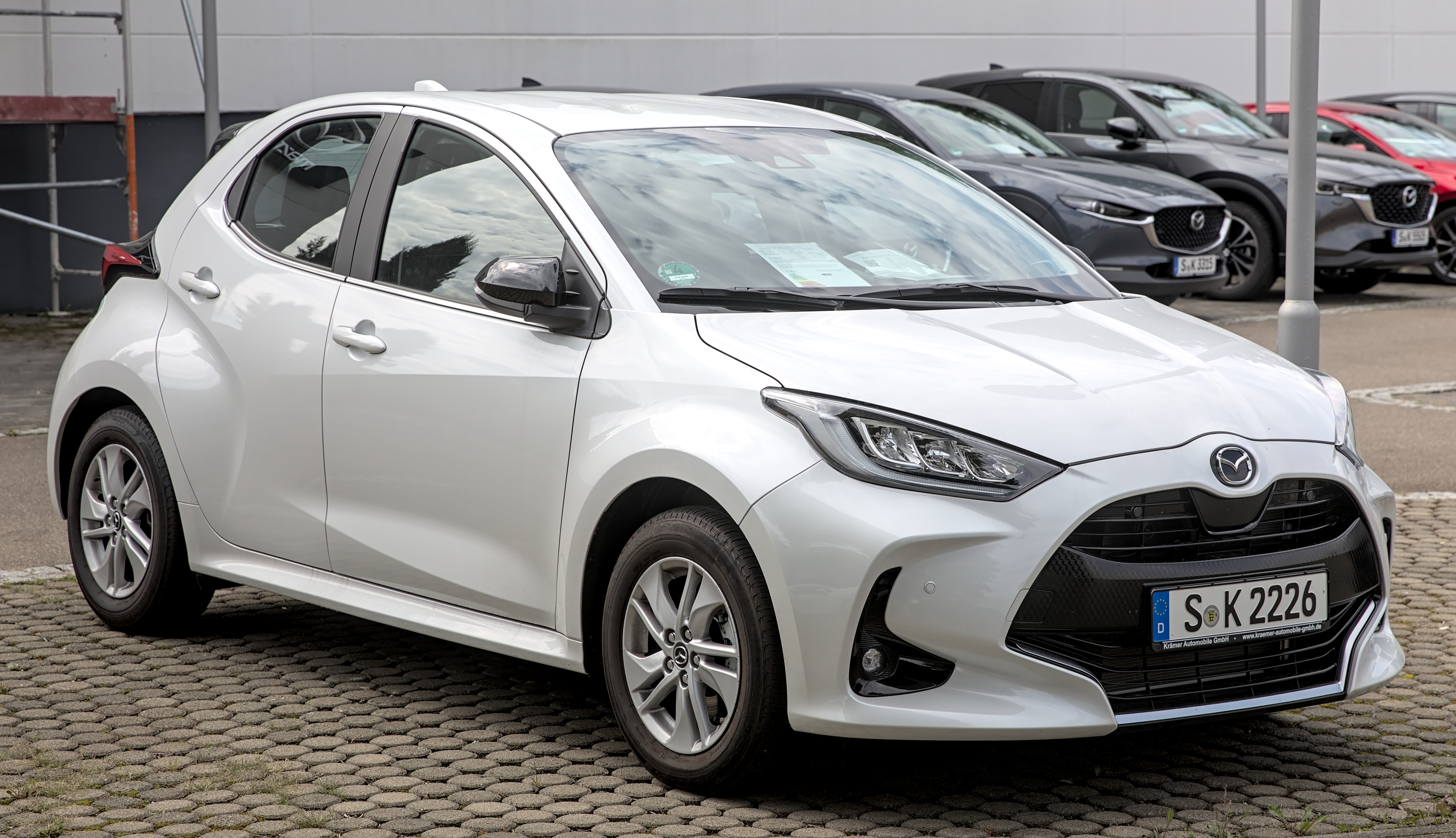
Mazda2 Hybrid (December 2021 – present)

== Former production ==
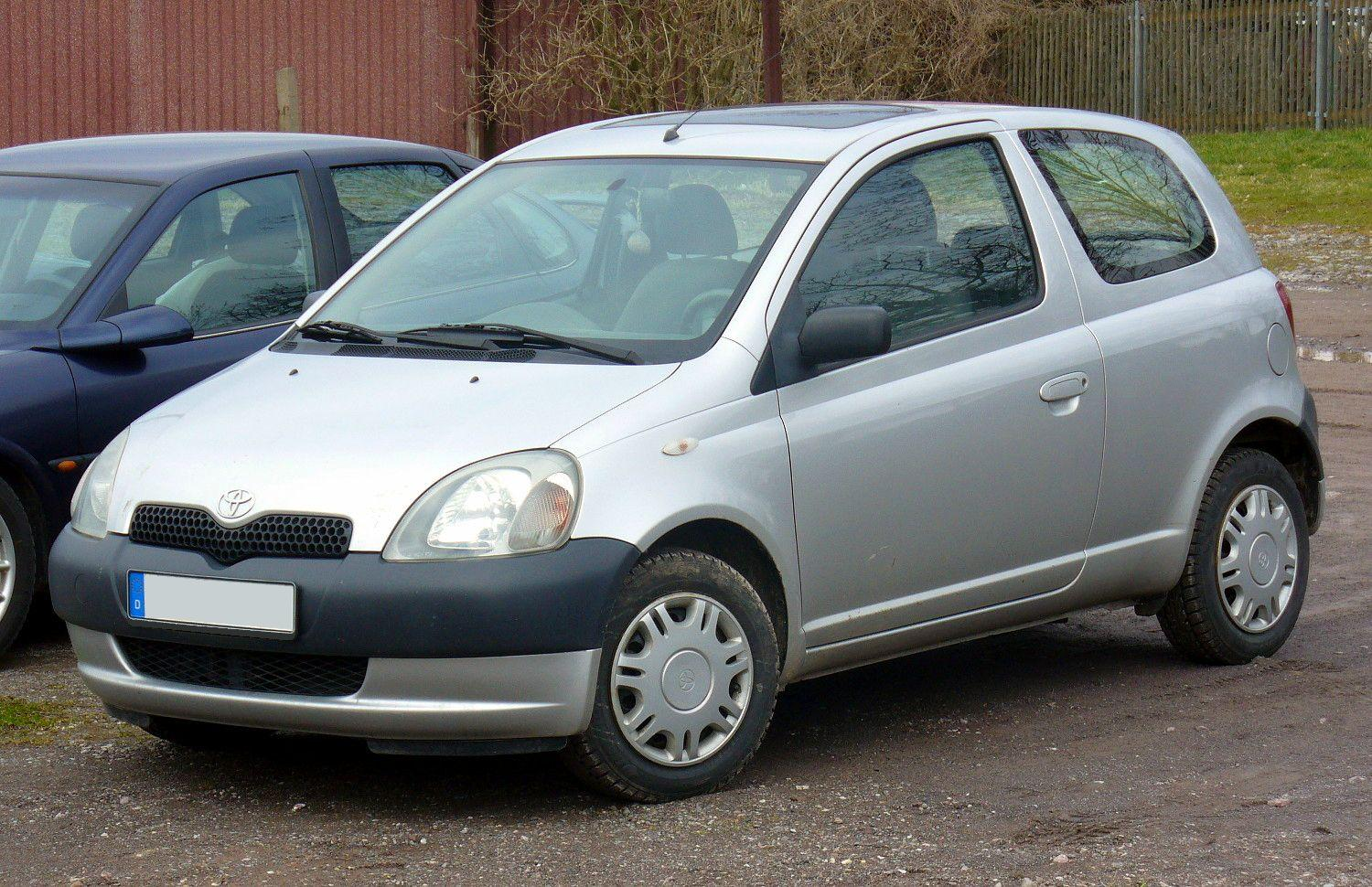
Toyota Yaris (XP10)
January 2001 – November 2005

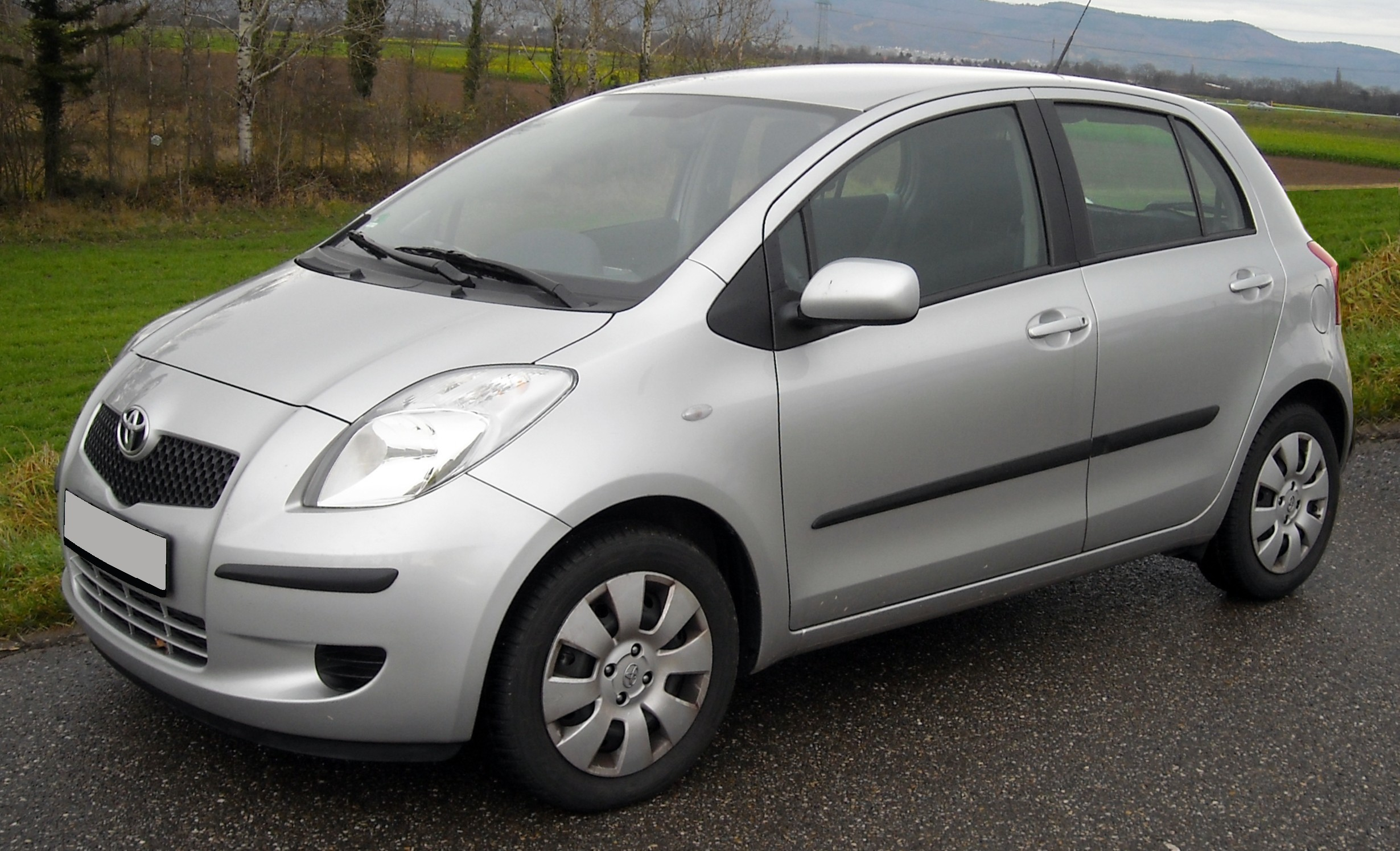
Toyota Yaris (XP90)
November 2005 – May 2011

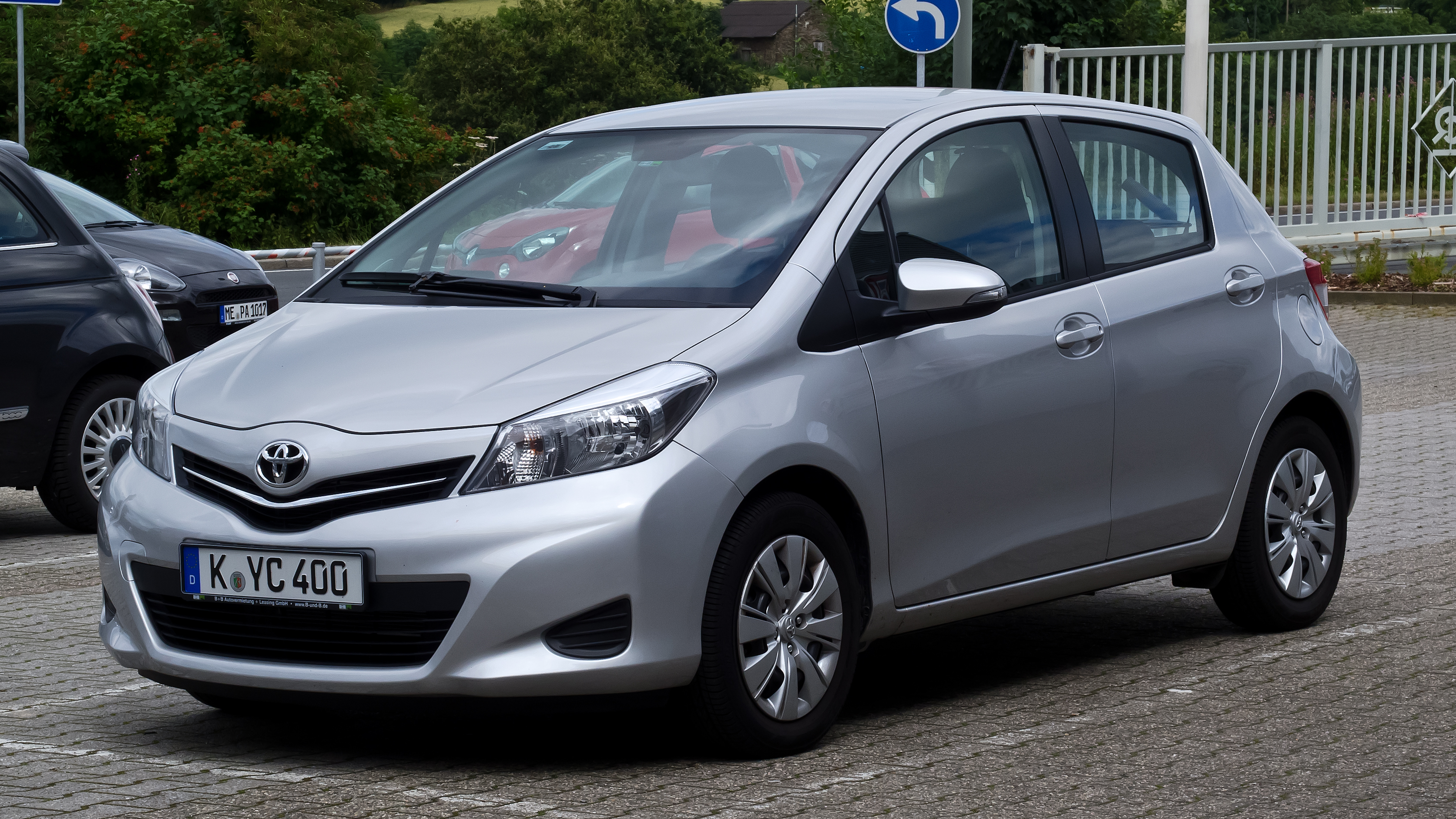
Toyota Yaris (XP130)
May 2011 – June 2020
