= Trine (surname) =

Trine is a North American surname. Notable people with the surname include:

- Grace Hyde Trine (1874–1972), American writer, lecturer, dramatic reader; wife of Ralph Waldo Trine
- Greg Trine, American author of children’s books and young adult fiction
- Ralph Waldo Trine, American philosopher and educator
- Will Orian "Dad" Trine (1869–1907), American professional sprinter and collegiate coach of track and basketball

== See also ==
- Trine (disambiguation)
- Karen Trines (born 1986), Canadian curler from Nepean
