= Tana =

Tana may refer to:

== Places ==
=== Africa ===
- Lake Tana, a lake in Ethiopia (and a source of the Nile River)
- Tana Qirqos, an island in the eastern part of Lake Tana in Ethiopia, near the mouth of the Gumara River
- Tana River County, a county of Coast Province, Kenya
- Tana River (Kenya), the longest river in Kenya
- Tana, a shorthand form of Antananarivo, the capital of Madagascar
- Tana, Guinea, a small village in Guinea

=== Americas ===
- Tana Glacier, a glacier in the Valdez–Cordova Census Area, Alaska
- Tana River (Alaska), a river in the Valdez–Cordova Census Area, Alaska
- Tana River (Cuba), a river of southern Cuba
- Tana (volcano), a volcano on Chuginadak Island, Alaska

=== Asia ===
- Tana Tidung Regency, a regency in Indonesia
- Kyzyl-Tana, a village in the Osh Province of Kyrgyzstan
- Tana Station, a railway station in the Aoba-ku, Yokohama, Kanagawa Prefecture, Japan
- Tana, Kukin Tana, or Tana Mayambu, former names of Thane, India

=== Europe ===
- Tana or Tanais, a medieval city and bishopric on the Sea of Azov
- Tana Municipality, a municipality in Finnmark county, Norway
- Tana bru, a village in Tana Municipality in Finnmark county, Norway
- Tana Church, a church in the village of Rustefjelbma in Tana Municipality in Finnmark county, Norway
- Tana River (Norway), the third longest river in Norway, located in Finnmark county

=== Oceania ===
- Tana or Tanna (island), an island in Vanuatu

== People ==
- Tana (rapper), Steven Lewis, American rapper known under the name tana (born 2006)
- Tana, a variant of the given name Tanya
- Kuo Hsing-chun (Amis name: Tana), a Taiwanese Amis weightlifter (born 1993)
- Dan Tana (1935–2025), Serbian-American restaurateur, actor and football administrator
- Elijah Tana (born 1975), a former Zambian footballer
- Nick Tana, the former chairman of the Australian football club Perth Glory
- Rawat Tana (born 1977), a wheelchair racer from Thailand who competes at the Olympic level
- Tana and Riri, the twin sisters who chose to die rather than sing in Akbar's court, in India
- Tana Chanabut (born 1984), Thai footballer who plays for Pattaya United
- Táňa Fischerová (1947–2019), Czech actress, writer, television host, politician and civic activist
- Tana French (born 1973), Irish novelist and theatrical actress
- Tana Hoban (1917–2006), American author and photographer
- Tana Mongeau (born 1998), American Internet personality
- Táňa Radeva (1957–2025), Slovak actress
- Tana Ramsay (born 1974), British TV broadcaster and author of bestselling books on cooking
- Tana Sripandorn (born 1986), a professional footballer from Thailand playing for Samut Songkhram FC
- Tana Umaga (born 1973), New Zealand rugby union footballer and former captain of the national team
- Tana Wood, biogeochemist and ecosystem scientist
- Pedro Tanausú Domínguez Placeres, commonly known as Tana (born 1990), a Spanish footballer

== Fictional characters ==
- Tana, a character from the video game Fire Emblem: The Sacred Stones
- Tana Moon, a fictional character who was a reporter in Metropolis in the Superboy comics
- T'Ana, a character in the animated series Star Trek: Lower Decks

== Organizations ==
- Telugu Association of North America (TANA)
- Tana FC Formation, a football club from Madagascar
- Tana Oy, a Finnish waste management company

== Religion and mythology ==
- Tana, claimed to be an early Etruscan name for the Roman goddess Diana, according to Aradia, or the Gospel of the Witches. This recognized as some Neopagans as accurate.
- The single form of Tannaim, Rabbinic sages whose views were record in the Mishnah

== Other uses ==
- 1641 Tana, a main-belt asteroid
- Tana, a minor Kazakh Jüz, or "tribe"
- Tāna (Thaana, Taana), the writing system for the Divehi language spoken in the Maldives
- Tana (film), an Albanian film from 1958
- Tána, "raids", a genre of ancient Irish tales, usually about a "cattle raid" (Táin Bó)
- Tana (plant), genus in the family Apiaceae
- Tana (fly), a genus in subfamily Chiromyzinae

== See also ==
- Taana (disambiguation)
- Tanna (disambiguation)
- Thana (disambiguation)
- Tane (disambiguation)
- Tan (disambiguation)
- Tanaji (Tana and -ji), Indian male given name
