= Trine (given name) =

Trine is a given name. Notable people with the surname include:

- Trine Andresen (born 1955), Norwegian artistic gymnast
- Trine Bakke (born 1975), Norwegian retired alpine skier
- Trine Bentzen (born 3 July 1973), Norwegian sports wrestler
- Trine Bramsen (born 1981), Danish politician
- Trine Christiansen, Danish former international cricketer
- Trine Dyrholm (born 1972), Danish actress, singer, and songwriter
- Trine Eilertsen (born 1969), Norwegian journalist and newspaper editor
- Trine Elvstrøm-Myralf (born 1962), Danish sailor
- Trine Fissum (born 1970), Norwegian wheelchair curler
- Trine Haltvik (born 1965), Norwegian handball coach and former player
- Trine Hansen (born 1973), Danish retired female rower
- Trine Hattestad (born 1966), Norwegian retired track and field athlete who competed in the javelin throw
- Trine Krogh (1955–2014), Norwegian freestyle, butterfly, and medley swimmer
- Trine Jepsen (born 1977), Danish singer, actress, and television presenter
- Trine Lise Sundnes (born 1970), Norwegian politician and trade unionist
- Trine Lotherington Danielsen (born 1967), Norwegian politician
- Trine Mach (born 1969), Danish politician
- Trine Michelsen (1966–2009), Danish model and actress
- Trine Mortensen (born 1994), Danish handbal
- Trine Nielsen (born 1980), Danish handball player and Olympic champion
- Trine Nordgård Stensaas (born 1980), Norwegian footballer
- Trine Østergaard (born 1991), Danish handball player
- Trine Pallesen (born 1969), Danish actress
- Trine Pedersen (born 1993), Danish handball player
- Trine Pilskog (born 1972), Norwegian middle-distance runner
- Trine Qvist (born 1966), Danish curler and Olympic medalist
- Trine Rein (born 1970), American-Norwegian singer
- Trine Rønning (born 1982), Norwegian former footballer
- Trine Schmidt (born 1988), Danish professional racing cyclist
- Trine Skei Grande (born 1969), Norwegian politician
- Trine Skjelstad Jensen (born 1994), Norwegian footballer
- Trine Søndergaard (born 1972), Danish photography-based visual artist
- Trine Stenberg Tviberg (born 1969), Norwegian former football player
- Trine Strand (born 1972), Norwegian sports wrestler
- Trine Tangeraas (born 1971), Norwegian footballer and Olympic medalist
- Trine Torp (born 1970), Danish politician
- Trine Troelsen (born 1985), Danish retired team handball player
- Trine Trulsen Vågberg (born 1962), Norwegian curler
- Trine Tsouderos, American journalist
- Trine Villadsen (born 1995), Danish badminton player
- Trine Wiggen (born 1968), Norwegian actress

== See also ==
- Trine (disambiguation)
