= Tein =

Tein may refer to:

== People ==
- Amat Tein (14–15th century), minister in the Hanthawaddy Kingdom of present-day Myanmar
- Min Tein, Burmese diplomat
- Tanel Tein (born 1978), Estonian basketball player
- Toomas Tein (born 1955), Estonian politician

== Other uses ==
- Tein (company), Japanese company
- The End is Nigh, videogame

== See also ==
- Thein
- Teign, a river in England
- Teind, a tithe
- Tiyin, a unit of currency
- Tain (disambiguation)
- Tien (disambiguation)
