= Taine =

Taine is a surname and a given name. Notable people with the name include:

== Given name ==
- Taine Basham (born 1999), Welsh rugby player
- Taine Murray (born 2002), New Zealand basketball player
- Taine Paton (born 1989), South African field hockey player
- Taine Pechet, American surgeon
- Taine Plumtree (born 2000), Welsh born New Zealand rugby player
- Taine Randell (born 1974), New Zealand rugby player
- Taine Robinson (born 1999), New Zealand rugby player
- Taine Tuaupiki (born 1999), New Zealand rugby player

== Surname ==
- Christophe Taine (born 1973), French footballer
- Hippolyte Taine (1828–1893), French critic and historian
- John Taine, pen name of Eric Temple Bell (1883–1960), Scottish novelist

== Fictional characters ==
- Charles Foster Taine, in the DC Comics universe
- Hiram Taine, protagonist in the 1958 novel The Big Front Yard by Clifford Simak
- Roger Taine, protagonist of the novels A Rough Shoot and A Time to Kill by Geoffrey Household
- Sydney Taine, in the Nightside comic series of Robert Weinberg

== See also ==
- Antaine
- Tain (disambiguation)
- Tana (disambiguation)
- Toine
