= Antaine =

- Pronunciation: Irish pronunciation: [ˈan̪ˠt̪ˠənʲə]
- Gender: masculine
- Language: Irish name

Origin
- Languages: Latin, Greek

Other names
- Anglicisation: Anthony

Antaine is the Irish name for many people known in the English language as Tony or Anthony. Notable people with this given name include the following:

== First name ==
- Antaine Ó Braonáin, Irish name for Anthony "Tony" Brennan (born 1944), Irish Gaelic football selector and player
- Antaine Ó Cadhain, Irish name for Anthony "Tony" Coyne (born 1961), Irish hurling manager and player
- Antaine Ó Cathasaigh, Irish name for Anthony Casey (born 1995), Irish Gaelic footballer
- Antaine Ó Ceallaigh, Irish name for Tony Kelly (born 1993), Irish hurler
- Antaine Ó Cuinneagáin, Irish name for Anthony Cunningham (born 1965), Irish hurler and hurling manager
- Antaine Dáibhis, Irish name for Anthony "Tony" Davis (born 1964), Irish Gaelic football coach, player and former sports broadcaster
- Antaine Ó Meachair, Irish name for Anthony Maher (born 1986), Gaelic footballer
- Antaine Móinbhíol, Irish name for Anthony "Tony" Mansfield (1939 – 2013), Irish hurler and manager
- Antaine Ó Murchú, Irish name for Anthony "Tony" Murphy (4 July 1950 – 13 October 2004) was an Irish Gaelic football player, selector and administrator
- Antaine Ó Súilleabháin, Irish name for Anthony O'Sullivan (born 1966), Irish hurler

== Surname ==
- Seán Antaine, Irish name for John Redmond "Jack" Anthony (1885 – 1964), Irish hurler

== See also ==
- Antoine
- List of Irish-language given names
- Taine (disambiguation)
