= Toyota Aygo =

City car produced by Toyota

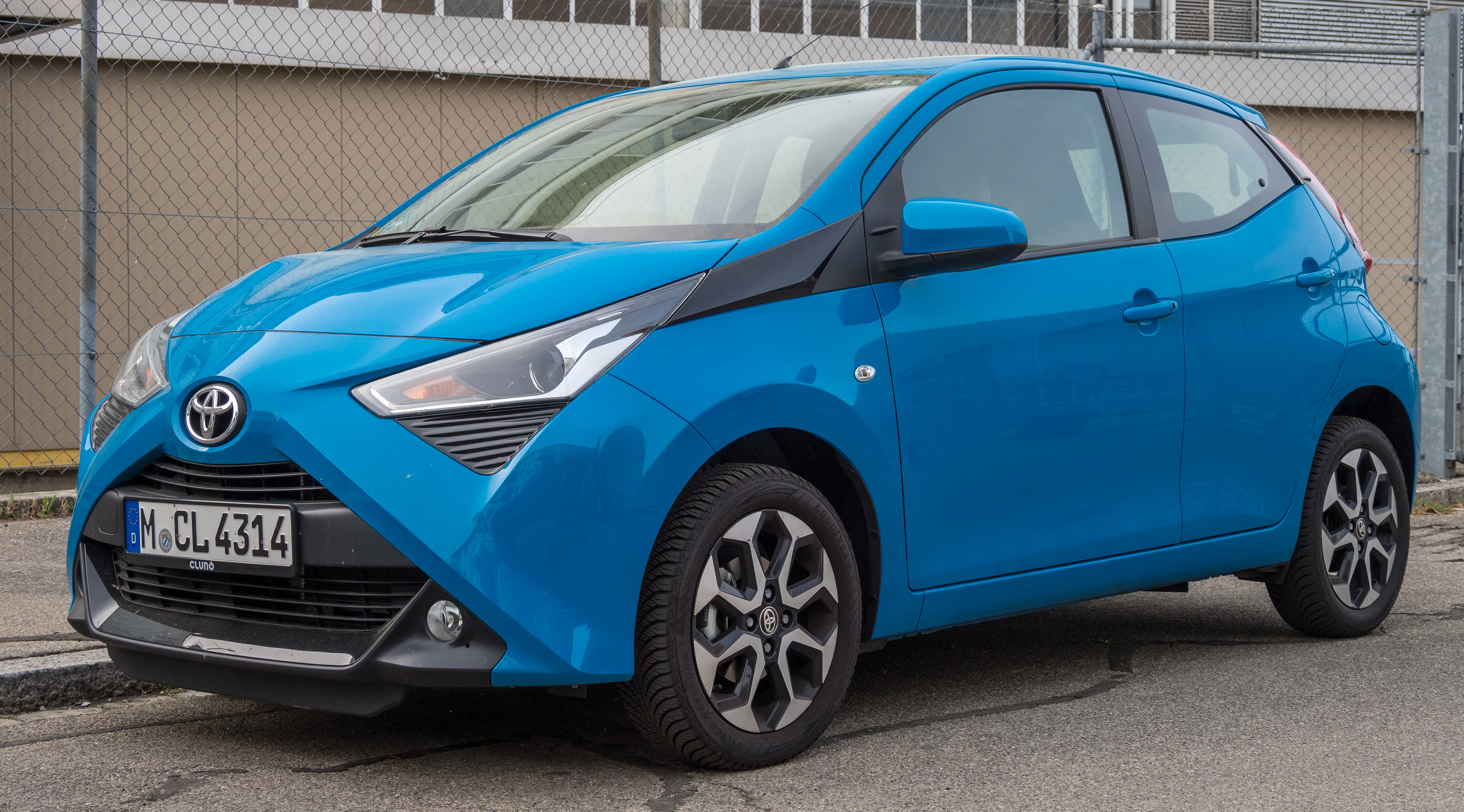
- Toyota Aygo (KGB40)

Overview
- Manufacturer: Toyota
- Production: February 2005 – present
- Assembly: Czech Republic: Kolín (TPCA/TMMCZ)

Body and chassis
- Class: City car (A) (2002–2022); Crossover city car (A) (2022–present)
- Body style: 3/5-door hatchback (2002–2022); 5-door SUV (2022–present)
- Layout: Front-engine, front-wheel-drive
- Related: Citroën C1 (2005–2022); Peugeot 107 (2005–2014); Peugeot 108 (2014–2021)

Chronology
- Successor: Toyota Aygo X; Toyota Agya (South Africa)

The Toyota Aygo is a city car (A-segment) marketed by Toyota mainly in the European market between 2005 and 2022 across two generations. The Aygo was first displayed at the 2005 Geneva International Motor Show. It was built alongside the related Citroën C1 and Peugeot 107/108 at the Toyota Peugeot Citroën Automobile Czech (TPCA) joint venture in Kolín, Czech Republic. The Aygo's production ended in 2021 and the model was replaced by the crossover-styled Aygo X.

The name "Aygo" comes from "i-go", symbolising freedom and mobility.

== First generation (AB10/AB20/AB30; 2005) ==
First generation
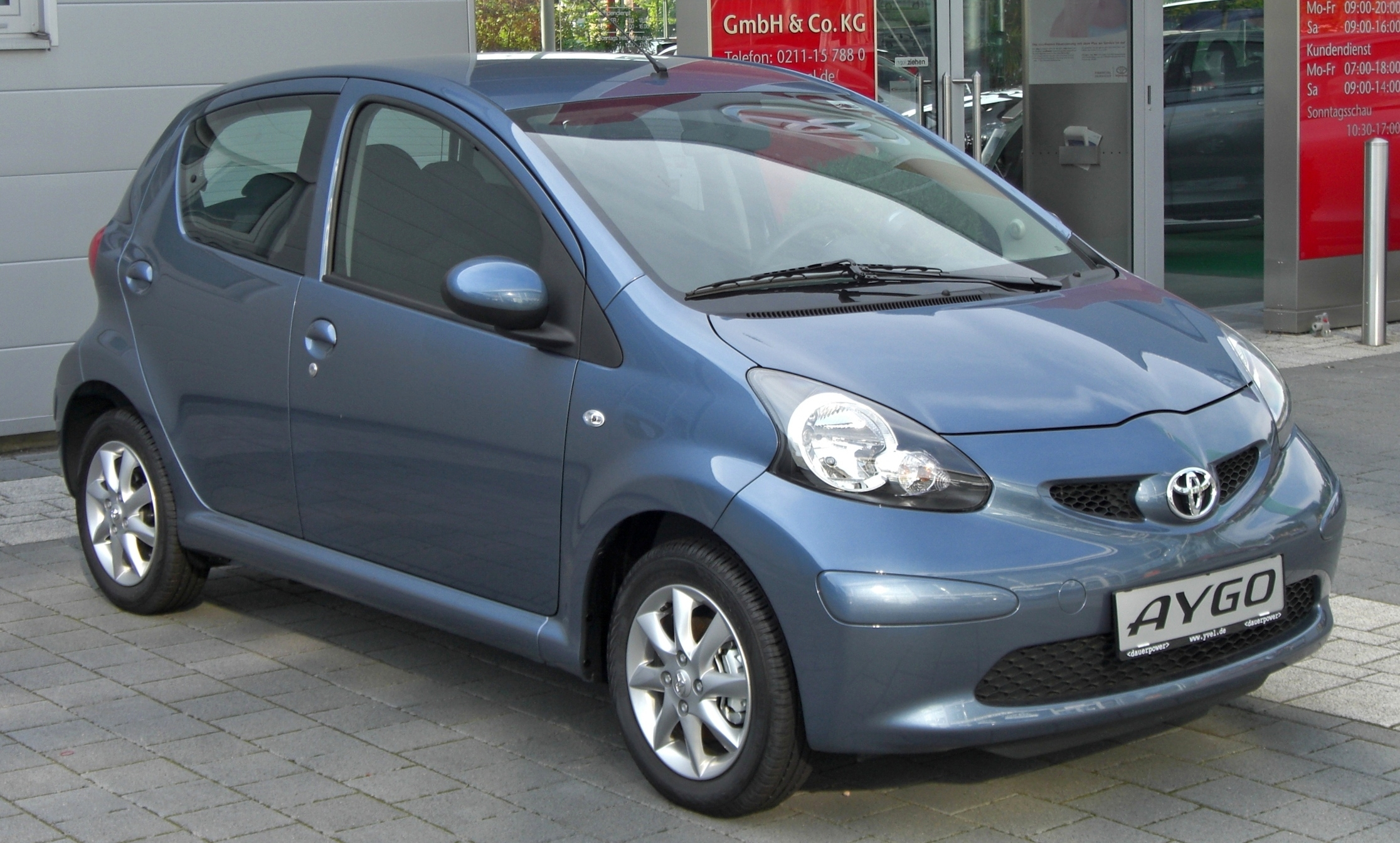

Overview
- Model code: AB10/AB20/AB30
- Also called: Peugeot 107; Citroën C1
- Production: February 2005 – 2014

Powertrain
- Engine: 1.0 L 1KR-FE I3 (petrol; KGB10); 1.4 L 2WZ (DV4-TD) I4 (diesel; WNB10)

Dimensions
- Wheelbase: 2,340 mm (92.1 in)
- Length: 3,405 mm (134.1 in)
- Width: 1,615 mm (63.6 in)
- Height: 1,465 mm (57.7 in)
- Kerb weight: 835–890 kg (1,841–1,962 lb)

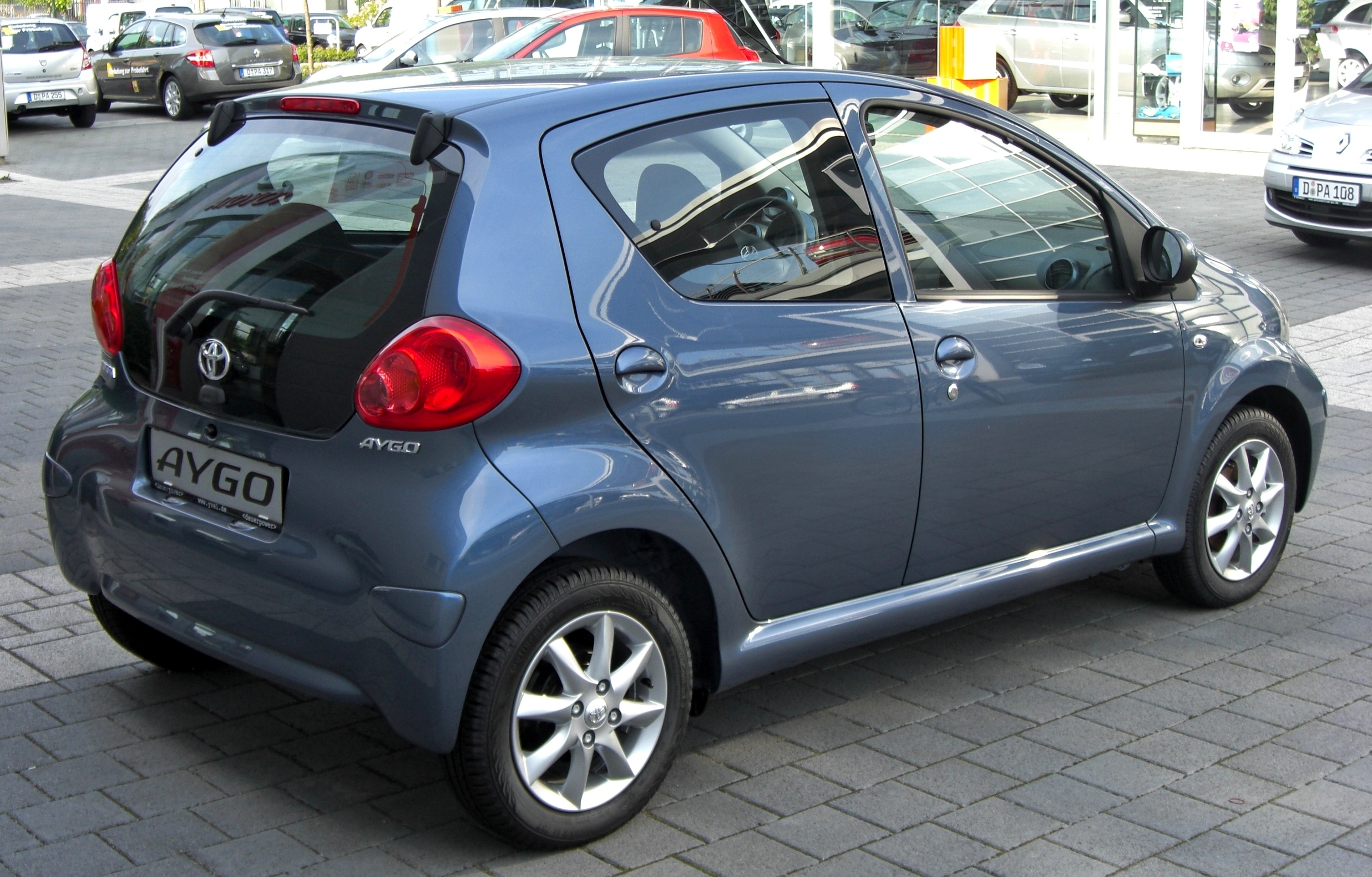
Pre-facelift Toyota Aygo

The decision to produce the cars was made on 12 July 2001 when the presidents of Toyota and PSA Peugeot Citroën, Fujio Cho and Jean-Martin Folz respectively, decided to produce a small car to share development costs. This project was called B-Zero. The Peugeot 107 and Citroën C1 are rebadged versions of the same car.

The main difference between the Aygo and its French siblings are badging, rear side windows, steering wheel, and the easily recognizable front and rear treatments. The planned production was 300,000 cars annually – 100,000 cars per brand. Sales began in July 2005, and the car was available as a three- or five-door hatchback. There were two engines available, a 1.0-litre, three-cylinder engine rated at 68 PS (50 kW), and a 1.4 L turbo-diesel I4 engine rated at 54 PS (40 kW).

The Aygo was used on BBC's Top Gear in a giant match of football, showcasing its maneuverability. The Top Gear presenters deemed the Aygo and its Peugeot and Citroën counterparts to be competent town cars.

A modified Aygo was also used on Fifth Gear to perform a twelve metre high loop the loop on a specially designed track to determine if a stunt that can be done using Hot Wheels toys can be replicated in real life. The stunt was driven by stuntman Steve Truglia in May 2009.

In January 2010, the Aygo was part of a worldwide recall by Toyota for a faulty sticking accelerator pedal. It was found that under some circumstances, the pedal could stick in a partially depressed position, or return slowly to the off position. The recall affected the Aygo, Peugeot 107 and Citroën C1 models built between February 2005 and August 2009. Information from Toyota later suggested, however, that only Aygos with automatic gearboxes were affected, and that those with manual gearboxes were not.

First generation models include:

- Aygo
- Aygo Active (2013)
- Aygo Active Plus (2013)
- Aygo Black
- Aygo Blue (2007) – lagoon blue edition
- Aygo ckIN2U (2007) – special edition made in collaboration with Calvin Klein
- Aygo Cool Blue (2008) – slate blue edition
- Aygo Easy (2011) – limited edition released in Switzerland
- Aygo Edition (2011)
- Aygo Fire (2012)
- Aygo Go! (2011)
- Aygo Ice (2011)
- Aygo Mode (2013)
- Aygo Mode with Air Con (2013)
- Aygo Move (2013)
- Aygo Move with Style (2013)
- Aygo Platinum (2008)
- Aygo+ (or Aygo Plus) (2006)
- Aygo Sport (2006)
- Aygo Team (2008)

=== 2009–2012 (AB20) ===
The Aygo received its first facelift, replacing the front bumper shape from the original, and changing the rear lights to a transparent appearance, from their original red tinted cluster. A revised clutch was fitted from this model onwards.

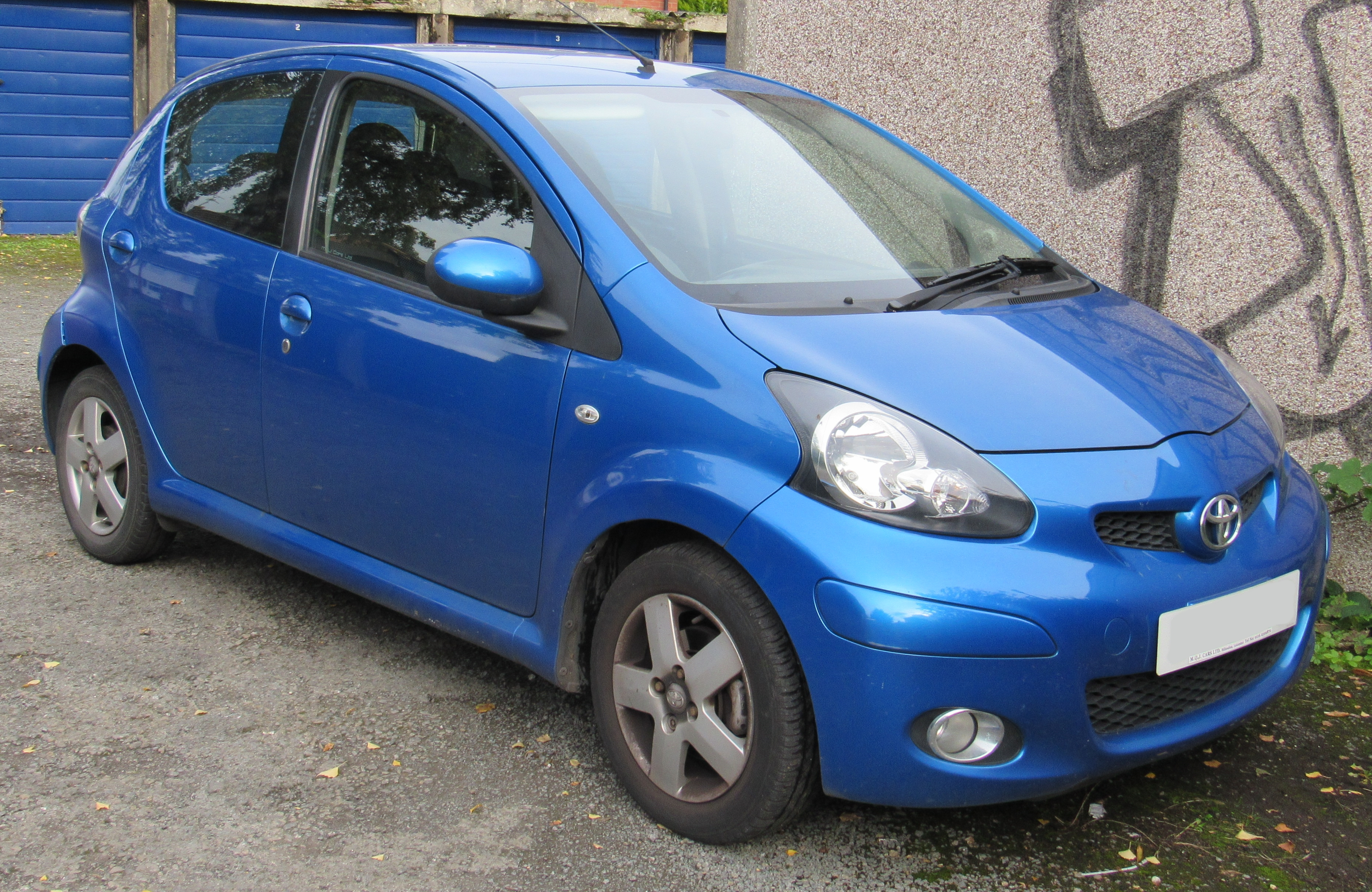
2010 Toyota Aygo facelift

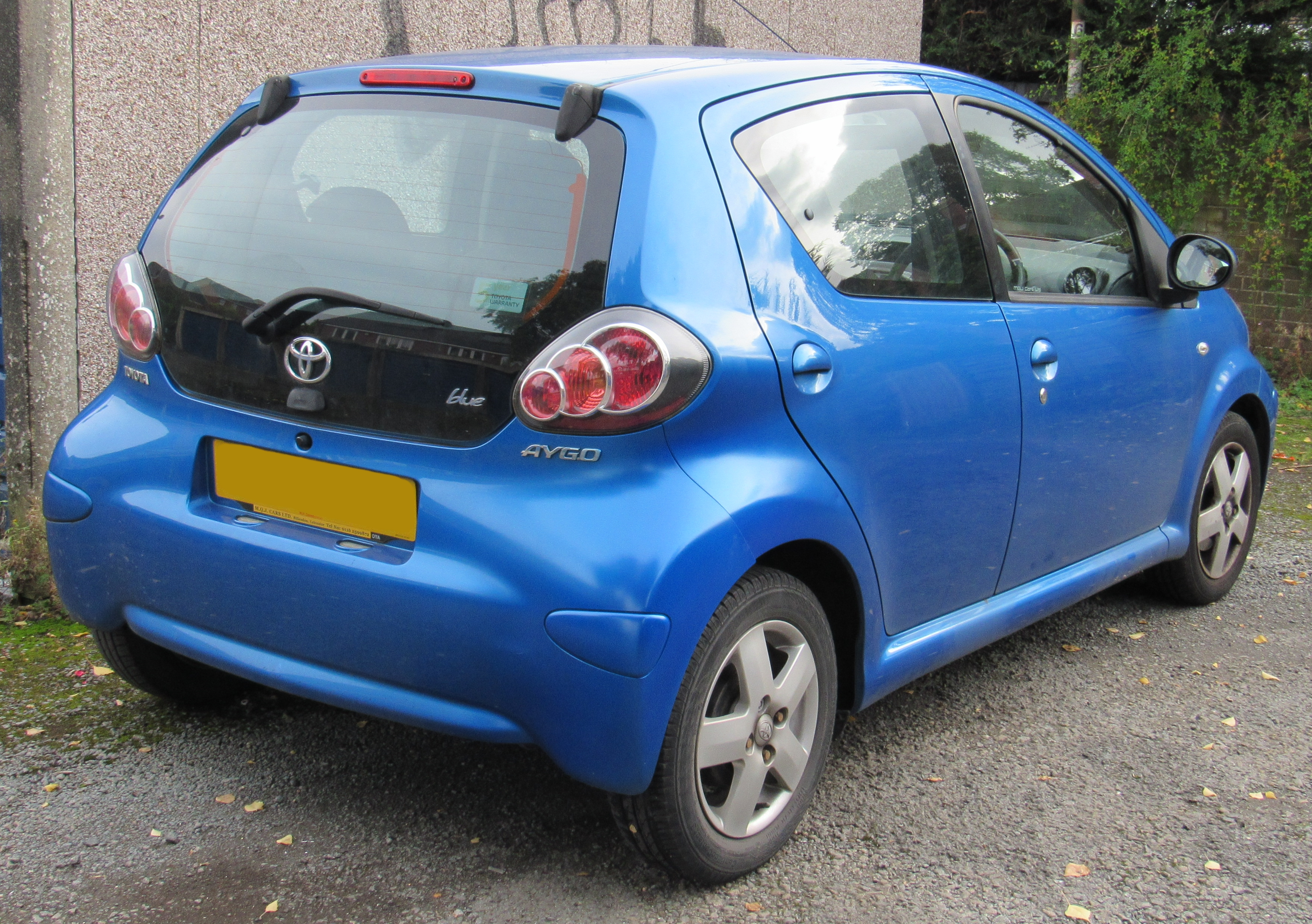
2010 Toyota Aygo facelift

=== 2012–2014 (AB30) ===
The Aygo received its second facelift, this time incorporating a more angular bumper with the inclusion of daytime running lights (DRL).

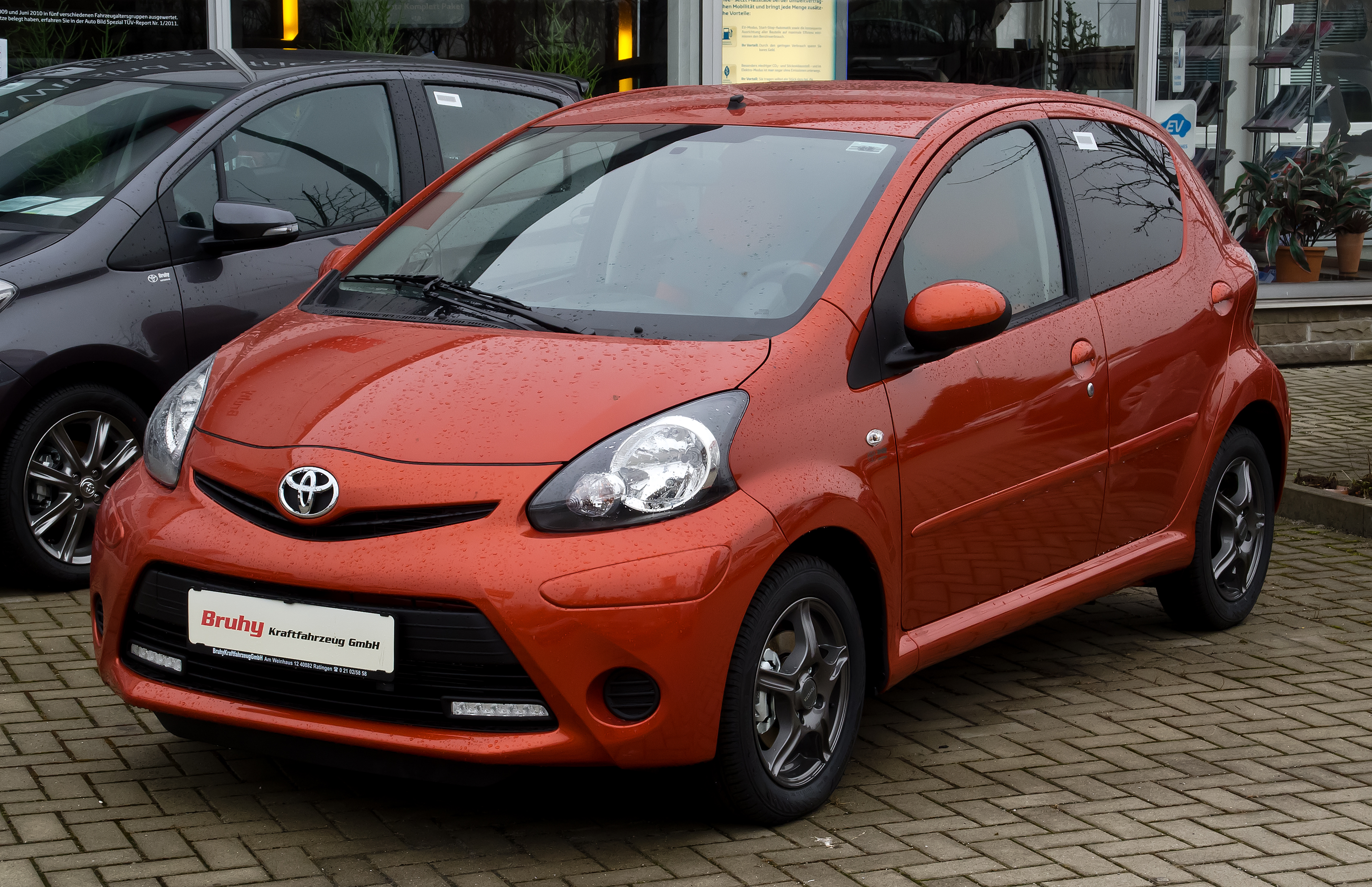
2012 Toyota Aygo facelift

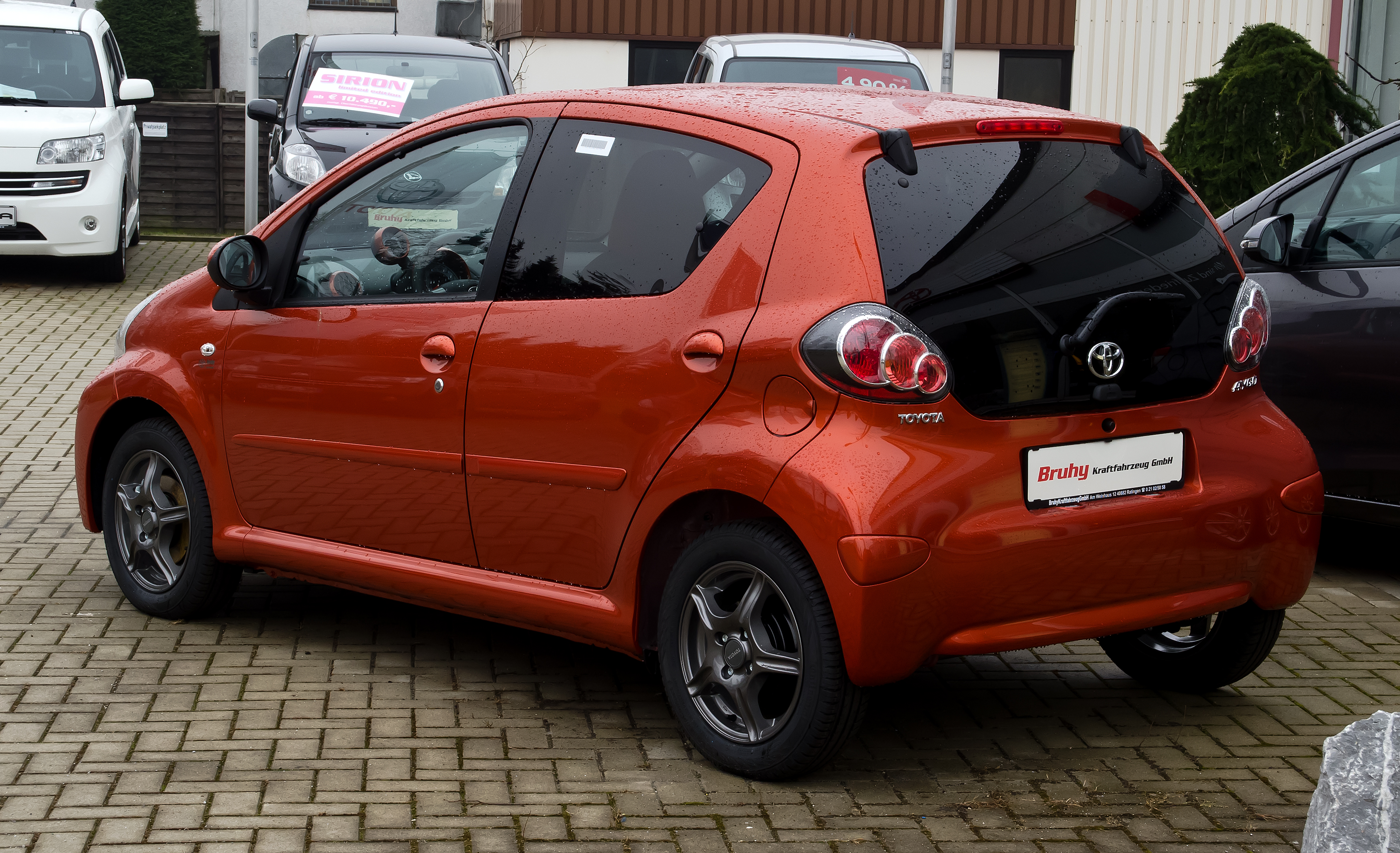
2012 Toyota Aygo facelift

=== Reliability ===
Breakdown statistics reported by the German Automobile Club in May 2010 placed the Aygo (which the data grouped with the Citroën C1 and Peugeot 107) at the top of the sub small car class, in respect of the low breakdown rates achieved for cars aged between one and four years.

=== Engines ===
Petrol engine
Model	Year	Engine	Displacement	Power	Torque	0–100 km/h (0–62 mph)	Top speed	Fuel economy (NEDC)	CO_{2} emission (g/km)
1.0 VVT-i	2005–2014	I3	998 cc	69 PS (51 kW; 68 hp) at 6,000 rpm	93 N⋅m (69 lbf⋅ft) at 3,600 rpm	12.3 s	158 km/h (98 mph)	4.3 L/100 km (66 mpg_{‑imp}; 55 mpg_{‑US})	99-109

Diesel engine
Model	Year	Engine	Displacement	Power	Torque	0–100 km/h (0–62 mph)	Top speed	Fuel economy (NEDC)	CO_{2} emission (g/km)
1.4 D-4D	2005–2007	I4	1398 cc	56 PS (41 kW; 55 hp) at 4,000 rpm	130 N⋅m (96 lbf⋅ft) at 1,750 rpm	14.8 s	154 km/h (96 mph)	4.0 L/100 km (71 mpg_{‑imp}; 59 mpg_{‑US})	109

=== Safety ===
Euro NCAP test results* Citroën C1 5 door LHD hatchback (2005)
Test	Score	Rating
Adult occupant:	26	4 /5 stars
Child occupant:	37	4 /5 stars
Pedestrian:	14	2 /4 stars

Euro NCAP test results* Toyota Aygo 1.0 High Grade, LHD (2012)
Test	Points	%
Overall:	3 /5 stars	
Adult occupant:	25	68%
Child occupant:	36	73%
Pedestrian:	19	53%
Safety assist:	5	71%

=== "Aygo Crazy" concept car ===
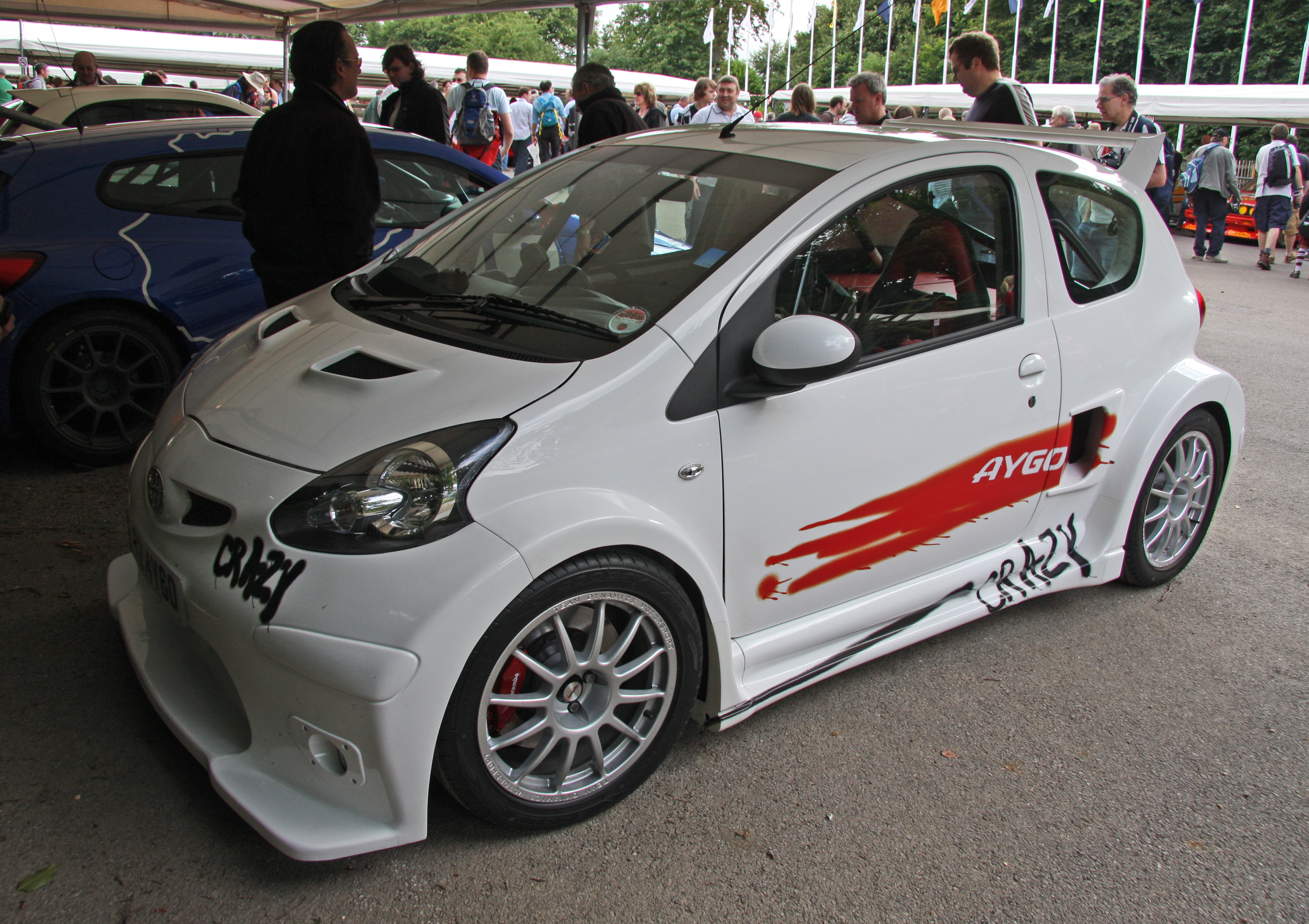
Toyota Aygo Crazy

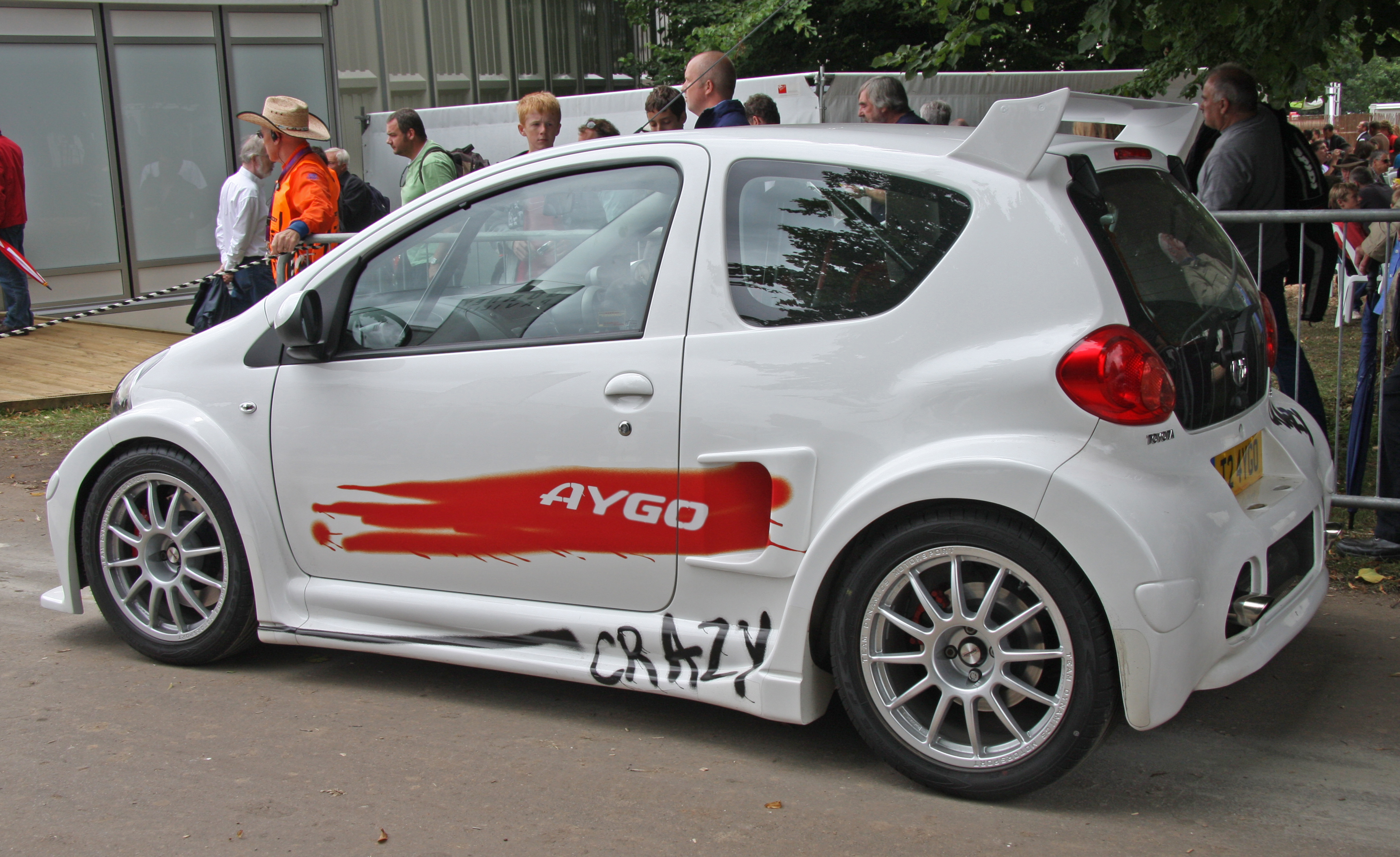
Toyota Aygo Crazy rear

In 2008, Toyota created a driveable one off concept car based on the Toyota Aygo with a mid-engine, rear-wheel-drive layout. Named the Aygo Crazy, it was unveiled to the public at the July 2008 British International Motor Show in London, before appearing at other motor shows that year based in the United Kingdom.

The Aygo Crazy has a Japanese-built 1ZZ-FE 1.8 litre VVT-i engine, mated to a five speed manual gearbox, both from the Toyota MR2, fitted with a Toyota Motorsport turbocharger conversion. The manufacturer claims the engine produces 147 kW (197 bhp) at 6,700 rpm and 240 N⋅m (177 lb⋅ft) torque at 3,400 rpm.

Weighing just 1,050 kg (2,315 lb), this gives it a 0–100 km/h (0–62 mph) sprint time of 5.75 seconds and a theoretical top speed of 204 km/h (127 mph), though the latter has not been tested. Unlike the standard Aygo, it has no driver aids, power steering or anti-lock brakes.

Exterior modifications include wider arches to accommodate the one inch of extra track, 17 inch alloy wheels with Goodyear tyres and a carbon fibre rear spoiler designed for the 322 km/h (200 mph) American Champ Car series.

Suspension is from the MR2, with adjustable Tein shock absorbers and MacPherson struts front and rear. To cope with the extra power, Toyota upgraded the standard 247 mm (9.7 in) front brake discs to a 328 mm (12.9 in) Brembo conversion, with 280 mm (11.0 in) ventilated rear discs replacing the 200 mm (7.9 in) drums normally found on the Aygo. An uprated Helix clutch is also used.

The interior features a partial roll cage for extra chassis rigidity and driver protection. Two specially designed sports seats, trimmed in red and black, and a suede rimmed Sparco steering wheel complete the race-inspired look.

Toyota claims the Aygo Crazy cost £100,000 to build.

=== BYD F0 ===
From 2008 to 2015, and again from 2019 to 2020, the Chinese car manufacturer BYD Auto has produced the BYD F0, an unlicensed clone of the Toyota Aygo.

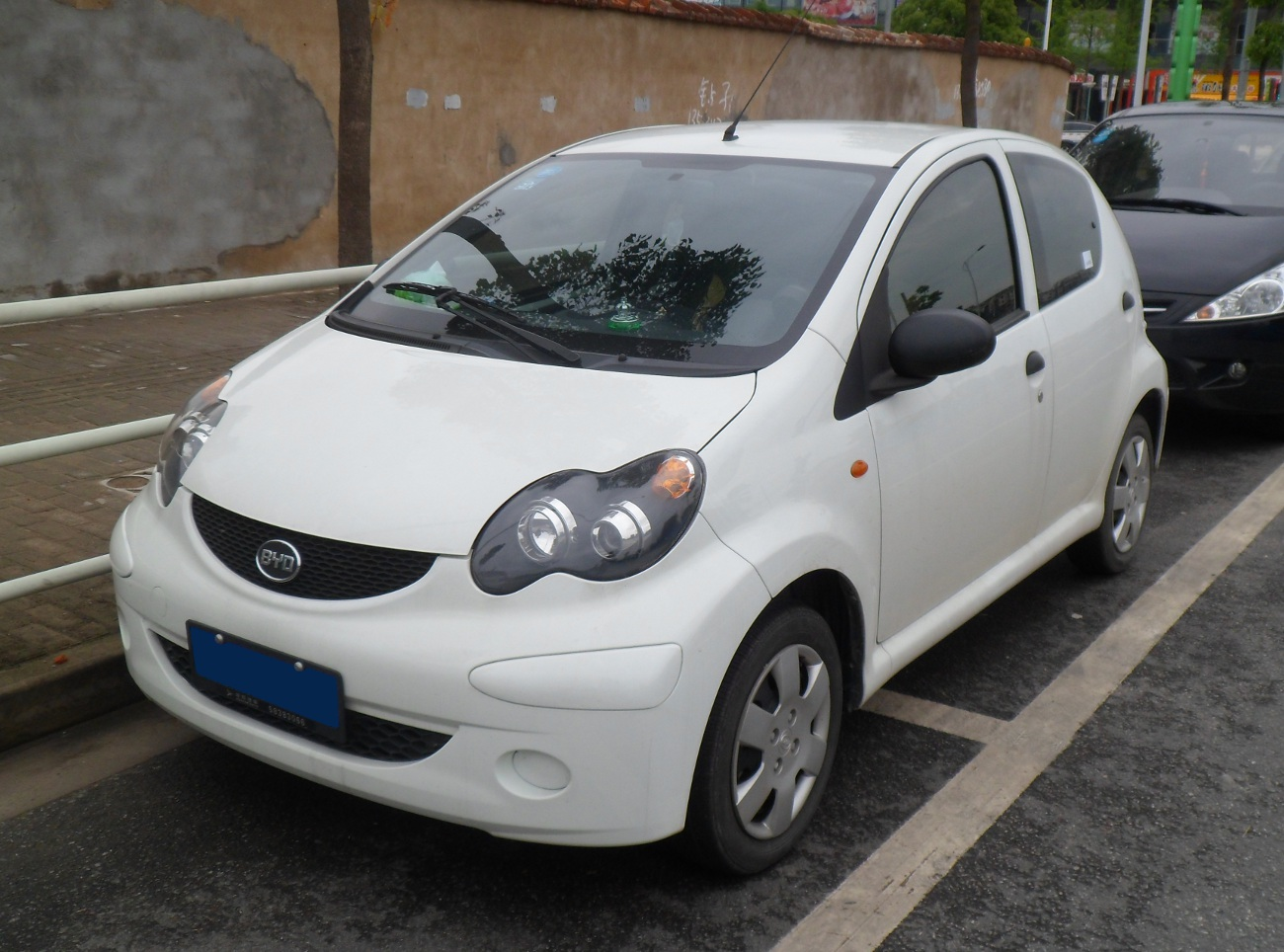
BYD F0 (Front)

== Second generation (AB40; 2014) ==
Second generation
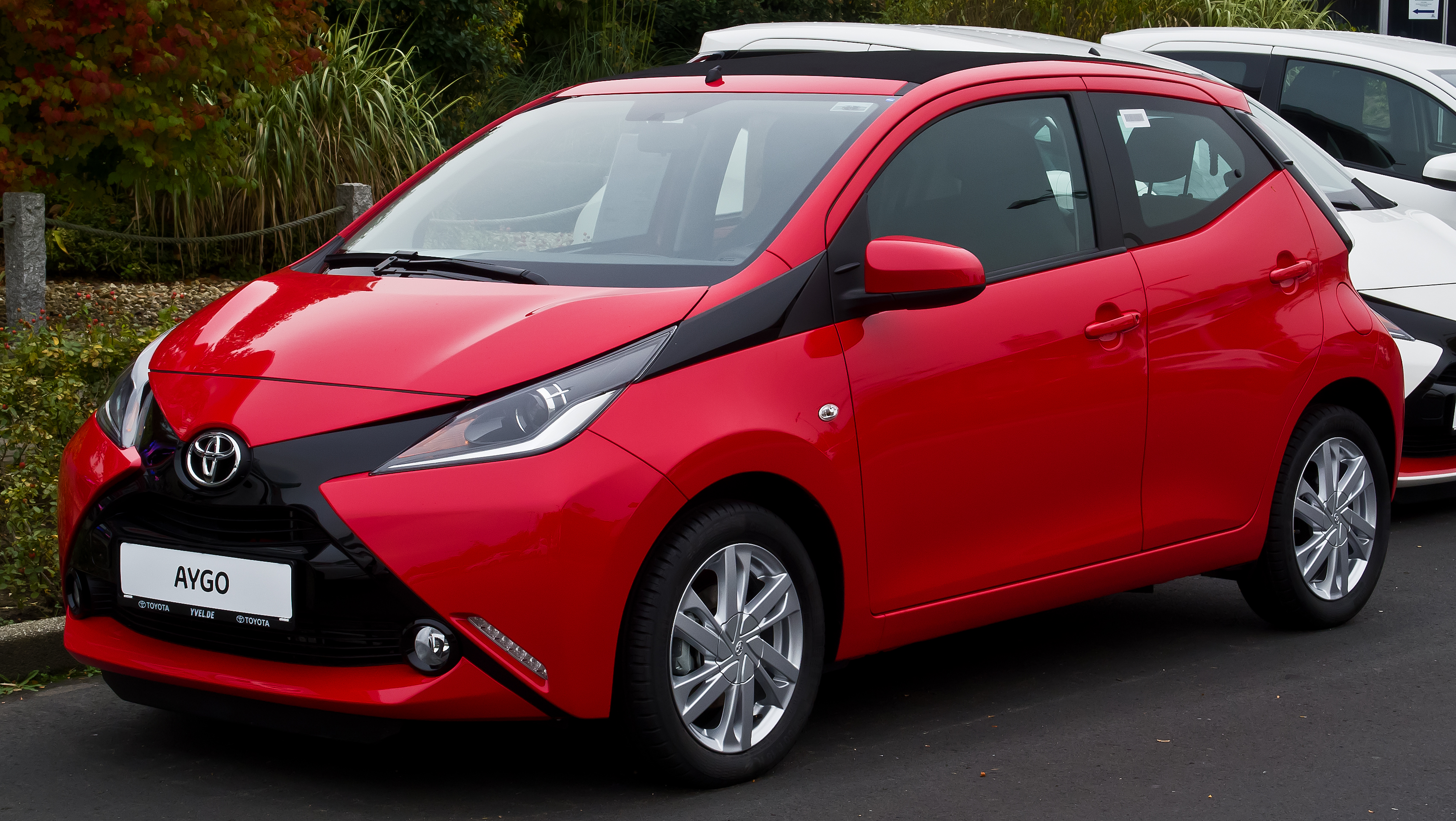

Overview
- Model code: AB40
- Also called: Peugeot 108; Citroën C1
- Production: May 2014 – February 2022

Powertrain
- Engine: 1.0 L 1KR-FE I3 (petrol) (2014-2018) 1.0 L 1KR-B52 I3 (petrol) (2018-2021)

Dimensions
- Wheelbase: 2,340 mm (92.1 in)
- Length: 3,455 mm (136.0 in)
- Width: 1,615 mm (63.6 in)
- Height: 1,460 mm (57.5 in)
- Kerb weight: 840–910 kg (1,852–2,006 lb)

Toyota revealed a completely redesigned Aygo at the March 2014 Geneva International Motor Show with the slogan 'go fun yourself'. The design was attributed to Japanese youth culture, inspired by Japanese manga robot Astro Boy and an egg in a box and has aims to make the Aygo more accessible to younger drivers, and allow for a greater level of customisability. It began rolling off the production line on 27 May 2014.

Models include:

- Aygo x – base model, with electric front windows, door mirrors and daytime running lights
- Aygo x-play – in addition to 'x' – manual AC, Bluetooth connectivity and steering wheel controls
- Aygo x-press
- Aygo x-style
- Aygo x-pression – in addition to 'x-play' – 15-inch silver alloys, part leather seats, 'x-touch' seven-inch multimedia system, DAB+ radio, front fog lights and rear view reversing camera
- Aygo x-plore
- Aygo x-trend
- Aygo JBL Edition – (special edition) – in addition to 'x-pression' – made in collaboration with JBL, features a JBL stereo system and a 160mm subwoofer
- Aygo x-cite – (special edition) – in addition to 'x-pression' – 15-inch gloss black alloys and optional 'x-nav'
- Aygo x-clusiv – (special edition) – in addition to 'x-pression' – 15-inch machined alloys, climate control AC, optional 'x-nav' and smart entry and start
- Aygo x-pure – (special edition) – in addition to 'x-pression' – (minus the part leather seats) comes in Pure White colour with silver trim 'X' and back bumper, white machined alloys and privacy glass in the back.
- Aygo x-claim – (special edition) – only 350 models manufactured, comes with a white bodywork with burgundy decals, electric retracting sunroof

The Aygo also includes numerous safety features such as vehicle stability control (VSC), anti lock braking system (ABS), hill start assist control (HAC) and supplemental restraint system (SRS) with six airbags.

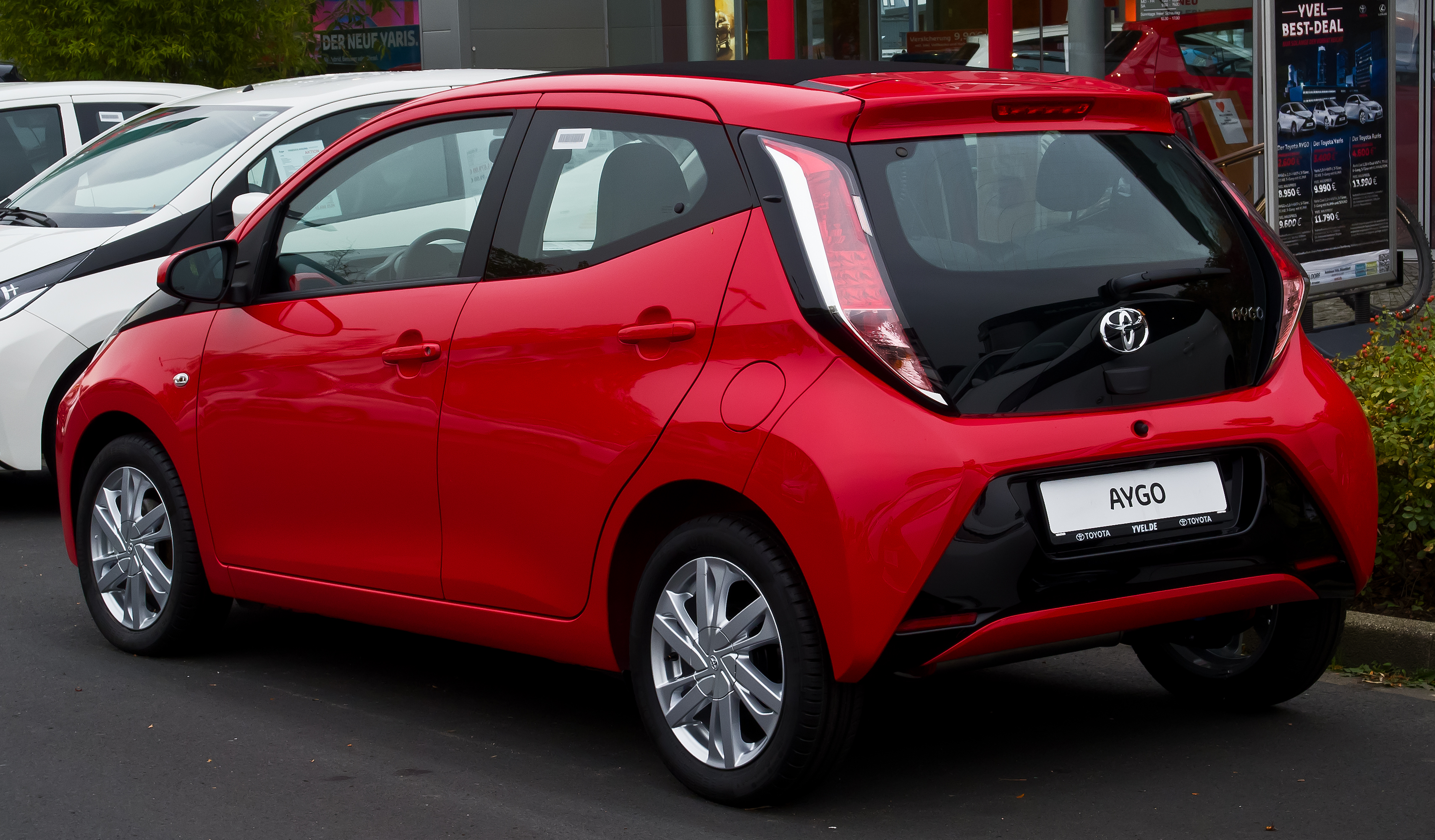
5-door (pre-facelift)

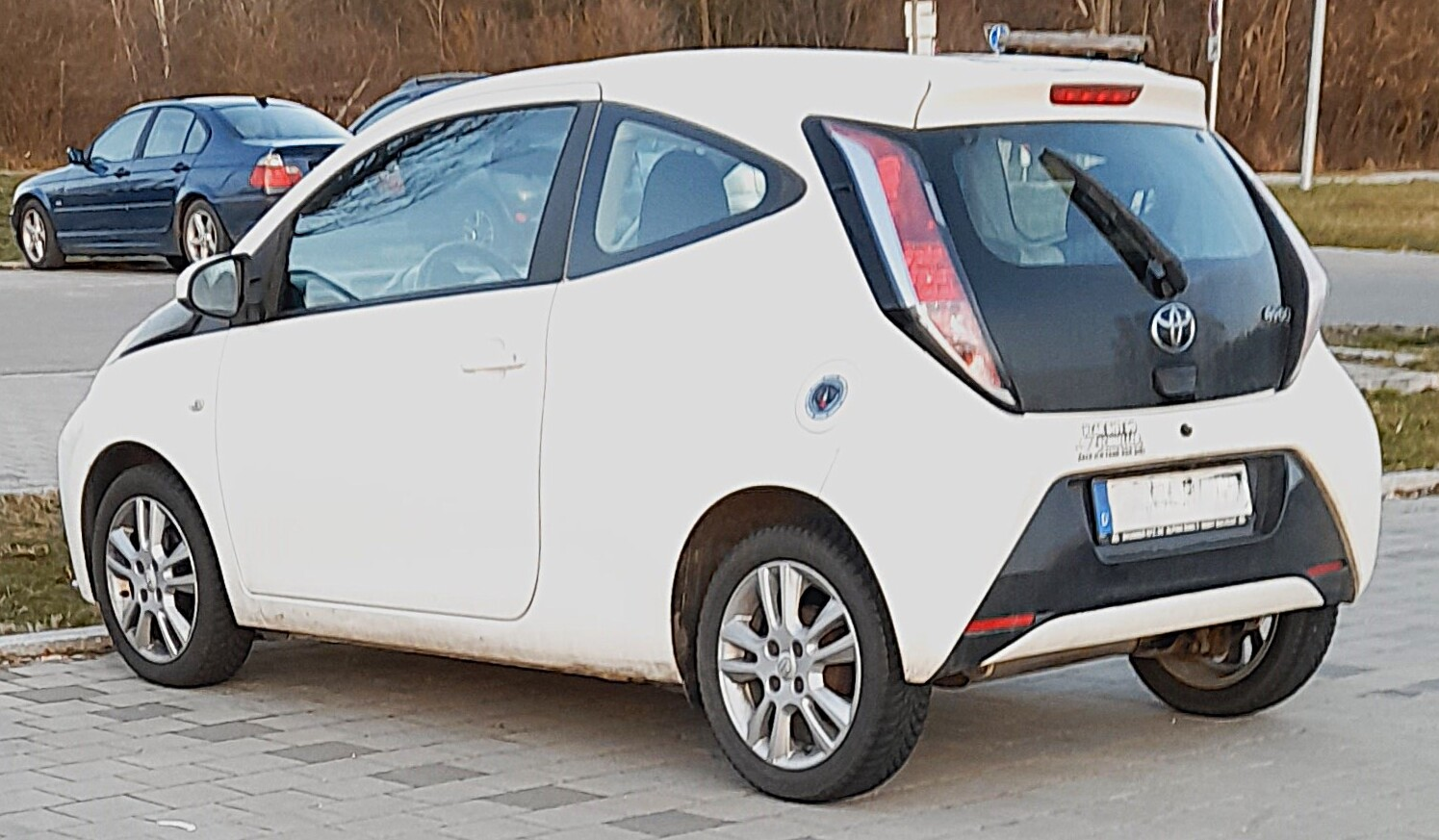
3-door (pre-facelift)

=== 2018–2021 ===
The refreshed second generation Aygo was unveiled at the March 2018 Geneva International Motor Show and features a new front bumper, headlights, tail lights and engine.

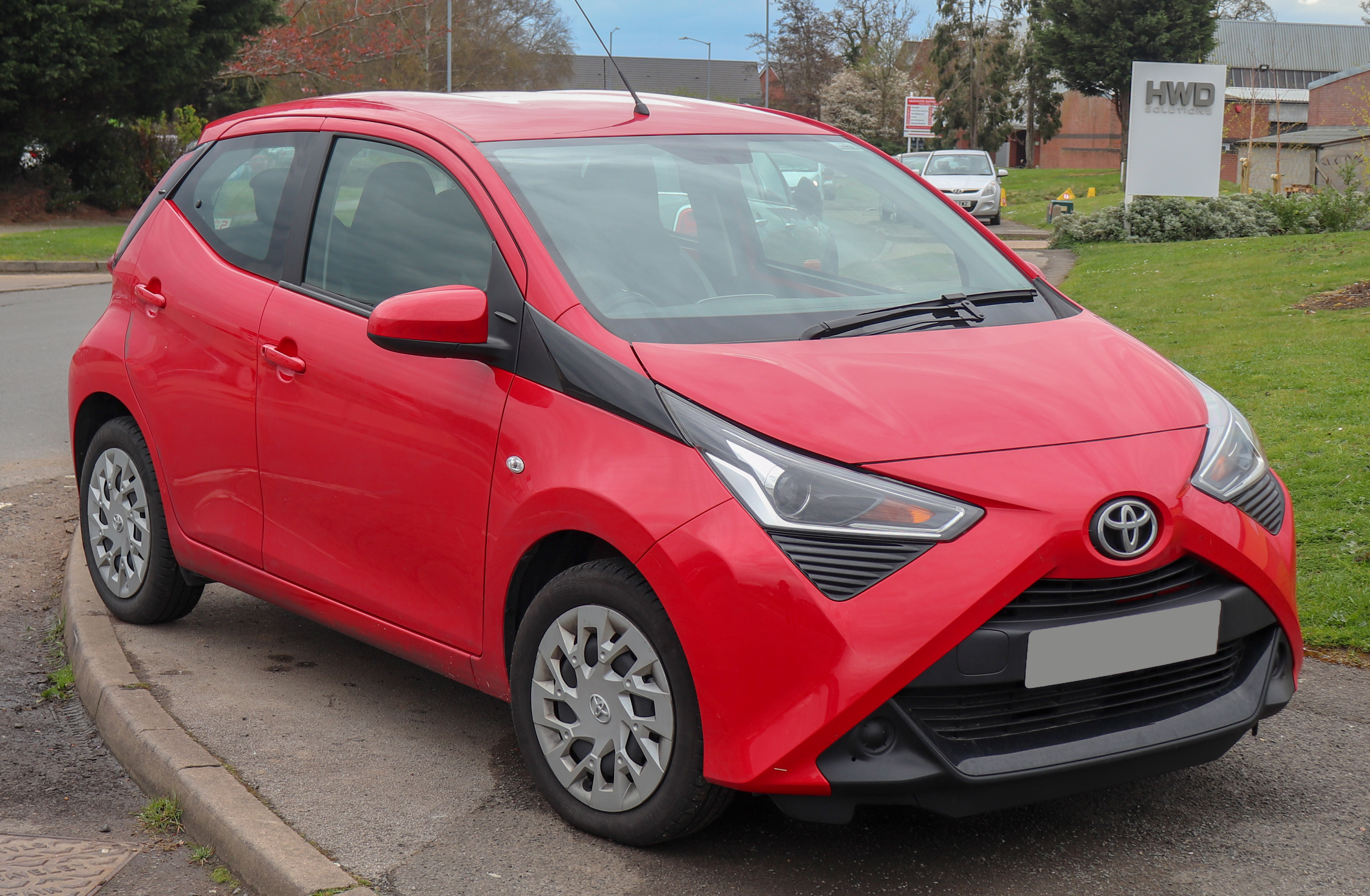
Front (facelift; UK)

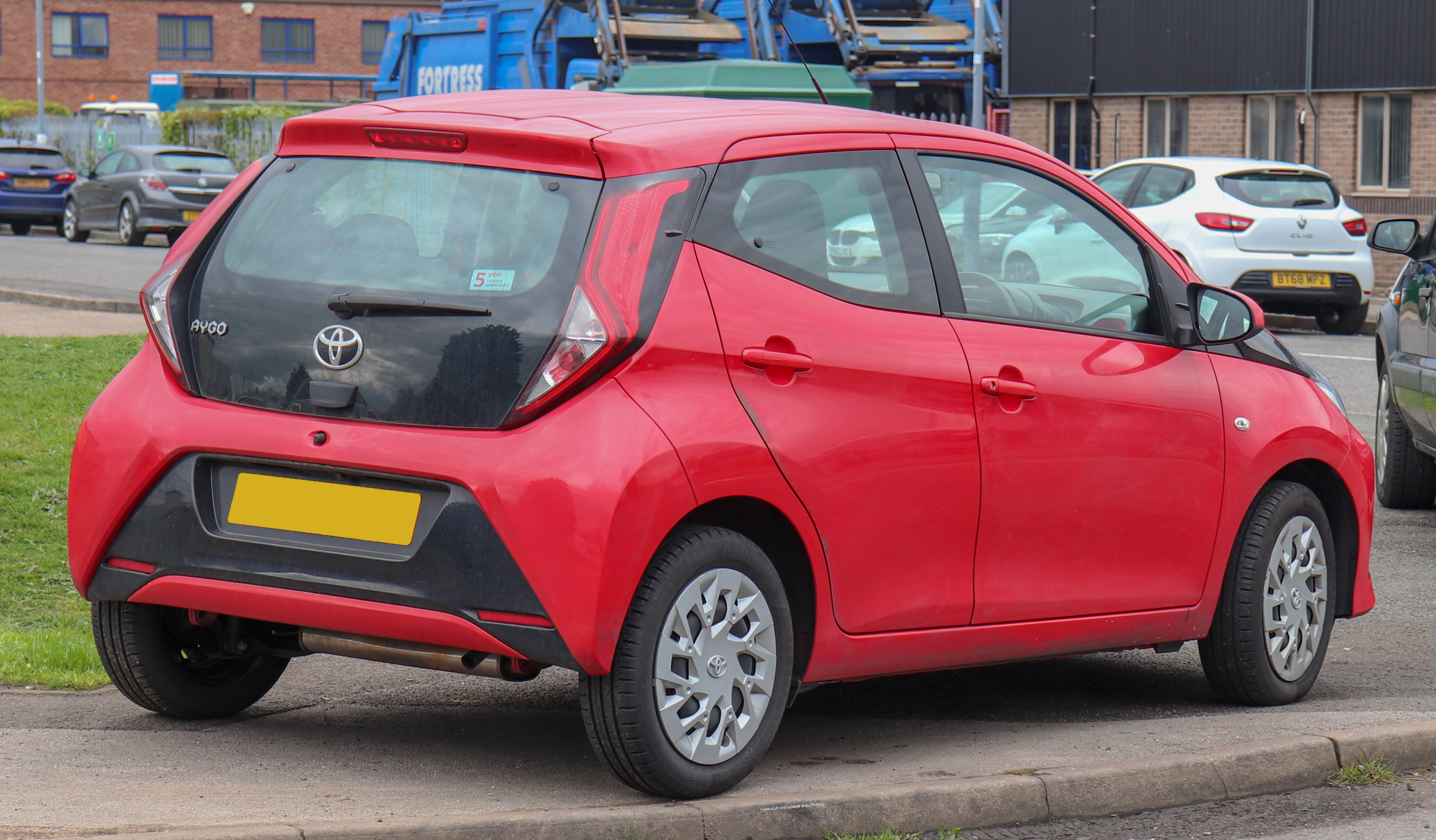
Rear (facelift; UK)

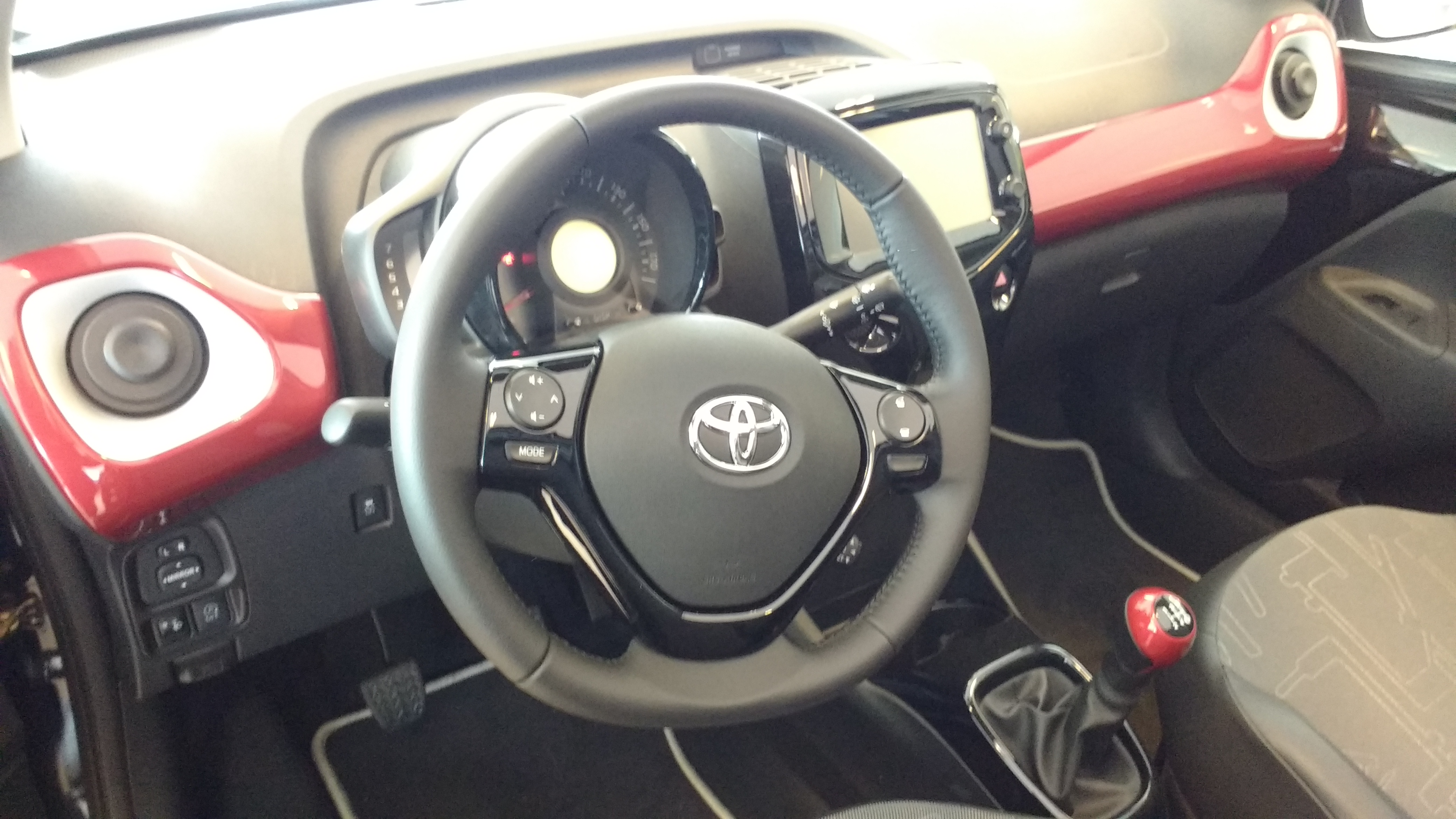
Interior

=== Engines ===
Petrol engine
Name	Year	Engine model	Displacement	Power	Torque	0–100 km/h (0–62 mph)	Top speed	Fuel economy (NEDC)	CO_{2} emission (g/km)
1.0 VVT-i	2014-2018	1.0 L 1KR-FE I3	998 cc	69 PS (51 kW; 68 hp) at 6,000 rpm	95 N⋅m (70 lbf⋅ft) at 4,300 rpm	13.0 s	160 km/h (99 mph)	4.1 L/100 km (69 mpg_{‑imp}; 57 mpg_{‑US})	90
1.0 VVT-i	2019-2022	1.0 L 1KR-B52 I3	998 cc	72 PS (53 kW; 71 hp) at 6,000 rpm	93 N⋅m (69 lbf⋅ft) at 4,400 rpm	12.6 s	160 km/h (99 mph)	3.8 L/100 km (74 mpg_{‑imp}; 62 mpg_{‑US})	86

=== Safety ===
Euro NCAP test results* Aygo 1.0 x-play (LHD) (2014)
Test	Points	%
Overall:	4 /5 stars	
Adult occupant:	31	80%
Child occupant:	39	80%
Pedestrian:	23	62%
Safety assist:	7	56%

== Third generation (AB70; 2022) ==
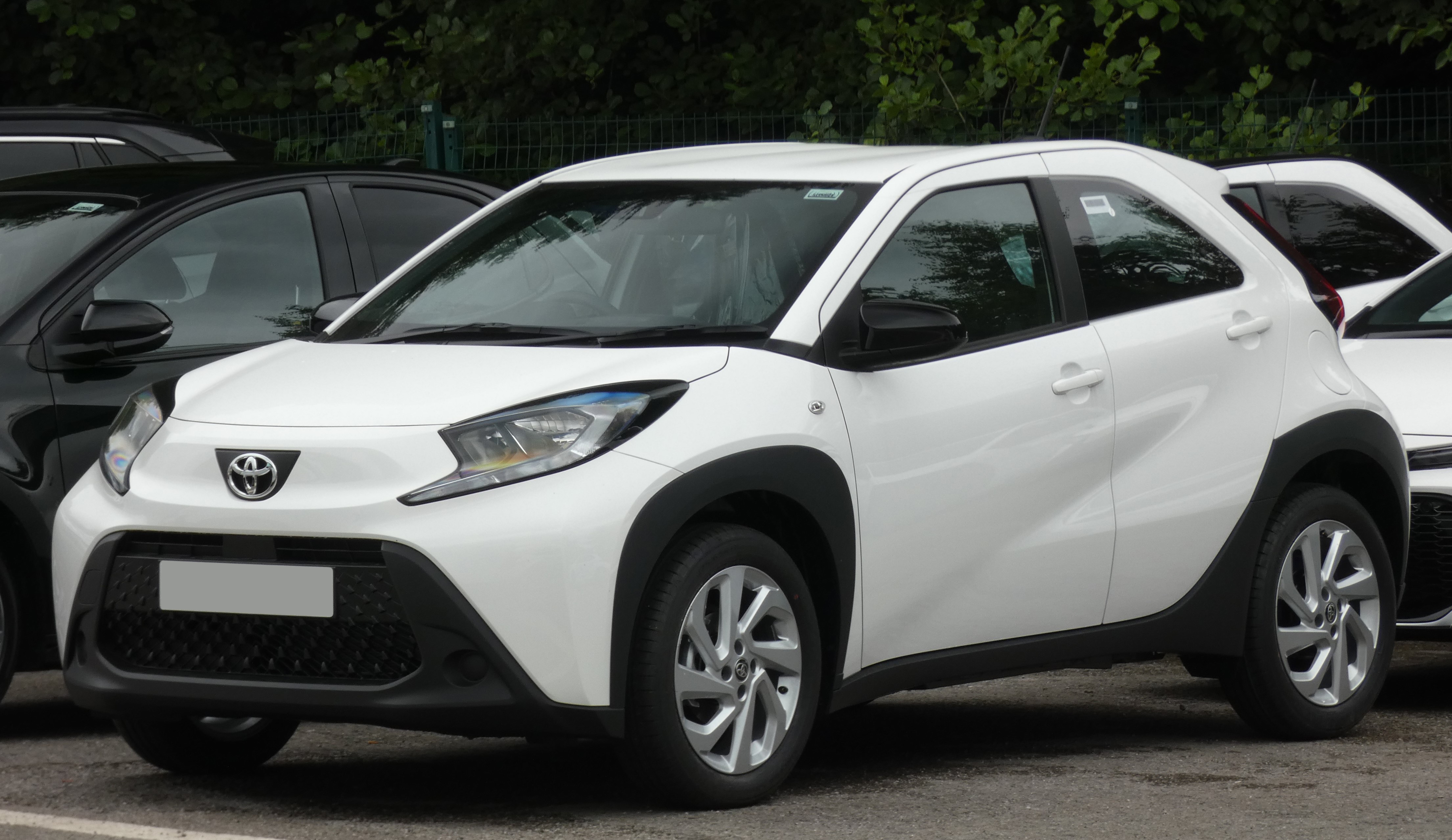
Toyota Aygo X

The third-generation Aygo was produced since March 2022 as the Toyota Aygo X, which adopts a more crossover-oriented styling. Previously, the model was previewed by the "Aygo X prologue" concept car in March 2021. It is built on the shortened version of the GA-B platform, and no longer has a Peugeot or Citroën counterpart as PSA Group (current Stellantis) pulled out of the joint project.

== Sales ==
Year	Europe (Note: Europe: 2020 EU 27 + UK + Switzerland + Norway + Iceland)
2005	21,360
2006	96,251
2007	102,671
2008	101,303
2009	103,252
2010	83,063
2011	88,477
2012	72,295
2013	63,993
2014	68,874
2015	86,085
2016	84,321
2017	84,588
2018	92,187
2019	99,510
2020	82,711
2021	82,820
2022	9,646

== See also ==
- List of Toyota vehicles
