= Tain (disambiguation) =

Tain is a town and royal burgh in the Highland council area of Scotland.

Tain may also refer to:

== Places ==
- Tain, Shekhawati, a village in Rajasthan, India
- Tain, the Romansch name of Davos Wiesen, a village in Switzerland
- Tain A.K, a union council between Thorar and Pachiot, Pakistan
- Tain (Parliament of Scotland constituency), pre-1707
- Tain Burghs (UK Parliament constituency), the historic district of Burghs constituency in Scotland
- Tain District, Ghana
- Tain River, Ghana
- Tain-l'Hermitage, a commune in the Drôme department, France
- Táin Way, a long-distance trail in County Louth, Ireland
- Tain railway station, Tain, Scotland

== Culture ==
- Any Táin Bó (cattle raid) of ancient Irish literature
  - Especially the Táin Bó Cúailnge, or "Cattle Raid of Cooley"
- The Tain (Decemberists album), 2004
- The Táin (Horslips album), 1973
- The Tain (novella), a 2002 novella by British author China Miéville
- Jeff "Tain" Watts (born 1960), American jazz drummer
- Enabran Tain, a Cardassian character on Star Trek: Deep Space Nine

== See also ==
- Taine (disambiguation)
- Tane (disambiguation)
- Tein (disambiguation)
