= Thana =

South Asian place or station

Thana means "station" or "place" in South Asian countries. The word thana originates from the Sanskrit word sthana or "sthanak", meaning "place" or "stand", which became Prakritised as thana.

- Thanas of Bangladesh, former subdistricts in the administrative geography of Bangladesh; later renamed upazila
- in (British) Indian history, a thana was a group of princely states deemed too small to perform all functions separately
- Thane is a city named after the word sthana (station), and is located in the Konkan division, a province of India
- Thana Bhawan (lit. 'station house'), also known simply as Thana, is a town in Uttar Pradesh, India

== See also ==
- The dictionary definition of thana at Wiktionary
- Tana (disambiguation)
- Thaana, also known as Tāna, the modern writing system of the Divehi language
