= Twine (disambiguation) =

Twine is a light string or strong thread composed of two or more smaller strands or yarns twisted together.

Twine may also refer to:

- Twine (band), an American electronic music duo
- Twine (device), a configurable device with sensors that can connect to a network
- Twine (marketplace), a marketplace that connects companies to creative professionals
- Twine (social network), a social networking and data storage site
- Twine (software), software for authoring HTML-based interactive fiction
- Derek Twine (born 1951), British scouting executive
- France Winddance Twine, Native American sociologist, ethnographer, visual artist
- The World Is Not Enough, a 1999 James Bond film
  - The World Is Not Enough (Nintendo 64 video game), a 2000 Nintendo 64 video game based on the film
  - The World Is Not Enough (PlayStation video game), a 2000 PlayStation video game based on the film
  - The World Is Not Enough (Game Boy Color video game), a 2001 Game Boy Color video game based on the film

== See also ==
- Toine
