= Toine =

Toine is a Dutch given name and a nickname with both masculine and feminine uses. It is a short form of Antoine and a diminutive form of Antonius, Anton, Antoon, Anthonis, Anthoon, Antonie, and Antonis used in Belgium, Netherlands, Suriname, South Africa, Namibia, and Indonesia. Notable people with this name include the following:

== Given name ==
- Toine Hezemans (born 1943), Dutch racing car driver
- Toine Manders (born 1956), Dutch politician (Member of the European Parliament)
- Toine Manders (born 1969), Dutch politician (former Libertarian Party leader)
- Toine van Huizen (born 1990), Dutch professional footballer
- Toine van Peperstraten (born 1967), Dutch sports journalist

== Nickname ==
- Toine Burks, nickname of Gregory Burks (born 1980), American basketball player
- Toine van Mierlo, nickname of Antonius Wilhelmus Matthias Theodore van Mierlo (born 1957), Dutch footballer
- Toine van Renterghem, nickname of Antoine François Mathieu van Renterghem (1885 – 1967), Dutch footballer

== See also ==
- Taine (disambiguation)
- Tine (disambiguation)
- Toinen, song
- Tone (disambiguation)
- Tonie
- Tonne (name)
- Towne (disambiguation)
- Trine (disambiguation)
- Twine (disambiguation)
