= Taana =

Taana may refer to:

- Thaana or Tāna, the writing system for the Maldivian language
- The initial title of film Kaaki Sattai
- Taana (film), 2020 Tamil film
- Taana Gardner, an American disco and post-disco singer
- "Ghoom Taana", a song by Pakistani sufi rock band Junoon

== See also ==
- Tana (disambiguation)
