= Trine =

Trine may refer to:

== Religion and mythology ==
- Trine (astrological aspect), an angle between planets of a horoscope
- The Trinity, in Christian theology

== Other uses ==
- Trine!, Norwegian black-and-white drama film from 1952
- Trine (given name)
- Trine (surname), American surname
- Trine (trimaran), a 32-foot (9.8 m) sloop sailboat built in the early 1960s
- Trine (video game), a 2009 video game by Frozenbyte
- Trine University, a small private university in Angola, Indiana, United States
- The number three

== See also ==
- Toine
