= Greg Trine =

American writer

Greg Trine is an American author of children's books and young adult fiction. He is the author of the Melvin Beederman Superhero series, Illustrated by Rhode Montijo and the young adult novel, The Second Base Club. His second series, The Adventures of Jo Schmo, illustrated by Frank Dormer, was a Junior Library Guild selection. The humorous science fiction novel, Willy Maykit in Space was nominated for the Sunshine State Young Readers Award. Since then, Greg has moved on to a graphic novel series, Dinomighty, written under the pen name Doug Paleo. Other stand-alone titles include Goldilocks Private Eye, George at the Speed of Light, Giant, Ruffing It, and Max Odor Does Not Stink.

Greg lives and works on the California coast. When he is not writing humorous books for kids, he can usually be found visiting schools and talking about the joys of reading and writing with children throughout the country.

== Bibliography ==
=== Melvin Beederman Series ===
1. The Curse of the Bologna Sandwich, Henry Holt and Co., 2006
2. The Revenge of the McNasty Brothers, Henry Holt and Co., 2006
3. The Grateful Fred, Henry Holt and Co., 2006
4. Terror in Tights, Henry Holt and Co., 2007
5. The Fake Cape Caper, Henry Holt and Co., 2007
6. Attack of the Valley Girls, Henry Holt and Co., 2008
7. The Brotherhood of the Traveling Underpants, Henry Holt and Co., 2009
8. Invasion from Planet Dork, Henry Holt and Co., 2010

=== The Adventures of Jo Schmo ===
- Dinos Are Forever, Houghton Mifflin Harcourt, 2012
- Wyatt Burp Rides Again, Houghton Mifflin Harcourt, 2012
- Shifty Business, Houghton Mifflin Harcourt, 2013
- Pinkbeard's Revenge, Houghton Mifflin Harcourt, 2013
- The Second Base Club, Henry Holt and Co., 2010
- "Willy Maykit in Space", Houghton Mifflin Harcourt, 2016
- "Dinomighty", Houghton Mifflin Harcourt, 2020
- "Dinomighty, The Heist Age", Houghton Mifflin Harcourt 2021
