= Grace Hyde Trine =

American writer, lecturer, dramatic reader, authority on pageantry (1874–1972)

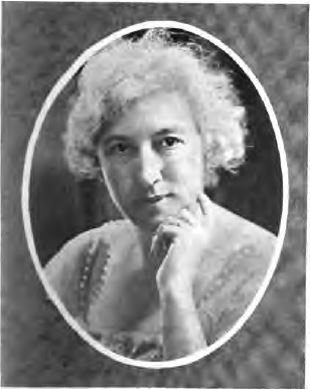
- (from a 1922 publication)
- Born: Grace Steele Hyde; August 30, 1874; Dunkirk, New York, U.S.
- Died: June 4, 1972 (aged 97)
- Education: Dr. Curry's School of Expression
- Occupations: writer; lecturer; dramatic reader
- Spouse: Ralph Waldo Trine (m. 1928; died 1958)
- Children: 1
- Writing career
- Period: 1920s
- Genre: pageants

Signature
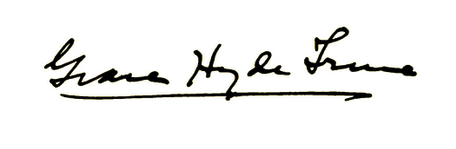

Grace Hyde Trine (August 30, 1874 – June 4, 1972), American writer, lecturer, and dramatic reader, was an authority on pageantry. She spent a large part of her time in giving interpretations of poetry.

== Early life and education ==
Grace Steele Hyde was born in Dunkirk, New York, August 30, 1874. Her parents were Lee Lord Hyde and Sarah Steele (née Mixer). Grace's siblings were: Lee (b. 1862), Harry (b. 1863), Henry (b. 1867), and Mary (b. 1877).

Trine graduated from Mohawk High School, 1893. Her technical training was gained in the U.S. and abroad, as well as at Dr. Curry's School of Expression (Boston, 1897).

== Career ==
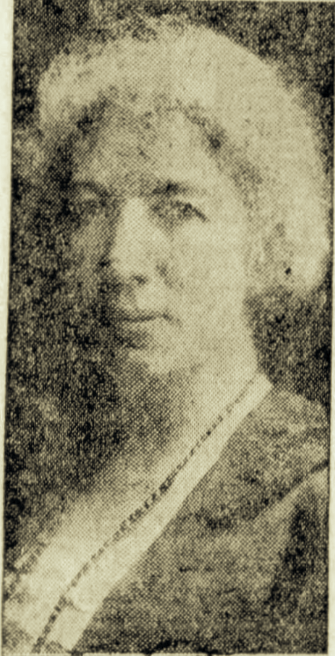
(1920)

In 1920, Trine compiled Dreams and Voices, a collection of poetry by U.S. and English contemporary poets. In its forward, Trine described her reasoning for publishing this collection of modern poetry:—

The theme of mother and child has been celebrated through the ages in sculpture, painting and poetry, and while many modern poets are seeking far and wide for themes that are “new,” the true and deep emotions of the human heart continue to find expression, even in the writings of many of the “new” poets themselves. It is the aim in this little collection to present some of the best poems on the mother and child relationship written in recent years, not forgetting to include several that deal also with the love of father and child. May the book cheer the mothers of the future, and those whose children still surround them, and those to whom a child is a living memory; in brief, may it bring a greeting to every mother.

Trine wrote and produced plays and pageants. She was a co-organizer of the Beechwood Players in Scarborough-on-the-Hudson before removing to California. Her The Great Blessing, was a pageant produced in 1921, in Golden Gate Park, San Francisco, California. The Spirit of the Sempervirens, a dramatic allegory based on the history of the California Redwoods was produced in 1922, and The Mesa Trail, a Pueblo Native American pageant, was produced the following year. The Mesa Trail was derived from Native American dreams and legends. The pageant so aroused the interest of Dr. George Wharton James, the noted authority on Native Americans, that he lent the town of Los Gatos many of his priceless Native American costumes for the use of the performers. A Masque of the New Year, written and directed by Trine, was performed on January 1, 1929, at the Memorial Auditorium of the Hollywood High School; the cast included Frederick Vroom and Philippe De Lacy.

Trine's poems were published by various magazines, including Harper's Bazaar, The Craftsman, and The Touchstone Magazine. She was a member of the Poetry Society of America, New York Browning Society, and on the executive board, San Francisco Branch, National League of American Pen Women. Trine served as president, Los Angeles branch, National League of American Pen Women, and in 1930, was elected to California vice-president of the League for Southern California.

== Personal life ==
In 1898, she married Ralph Waldo Trine, social worker, fruit grower, and book author. They had one son, Robert. The Trine's made their home in Los Gatos, California, but also had homes in New York City and Hollywood.

Grace Hyde Trine died June 4, 1972.

== Selected works ==
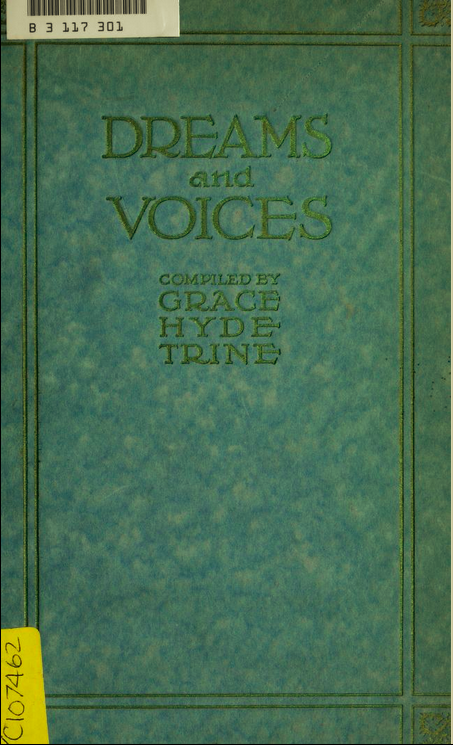
Dreams and voices

=== Books ===
- Dreams and Voices, 1920

=== Plays and pageants ===
- The Great Blessing, 1921
- The Spirit of the Sempervirens, 1922
- The Mesa Trail, 1923
- A Masque of the New Year, 1929
