= Tana Wood =

US biogeochemist and ecosystem scientist

Tana E. Wood
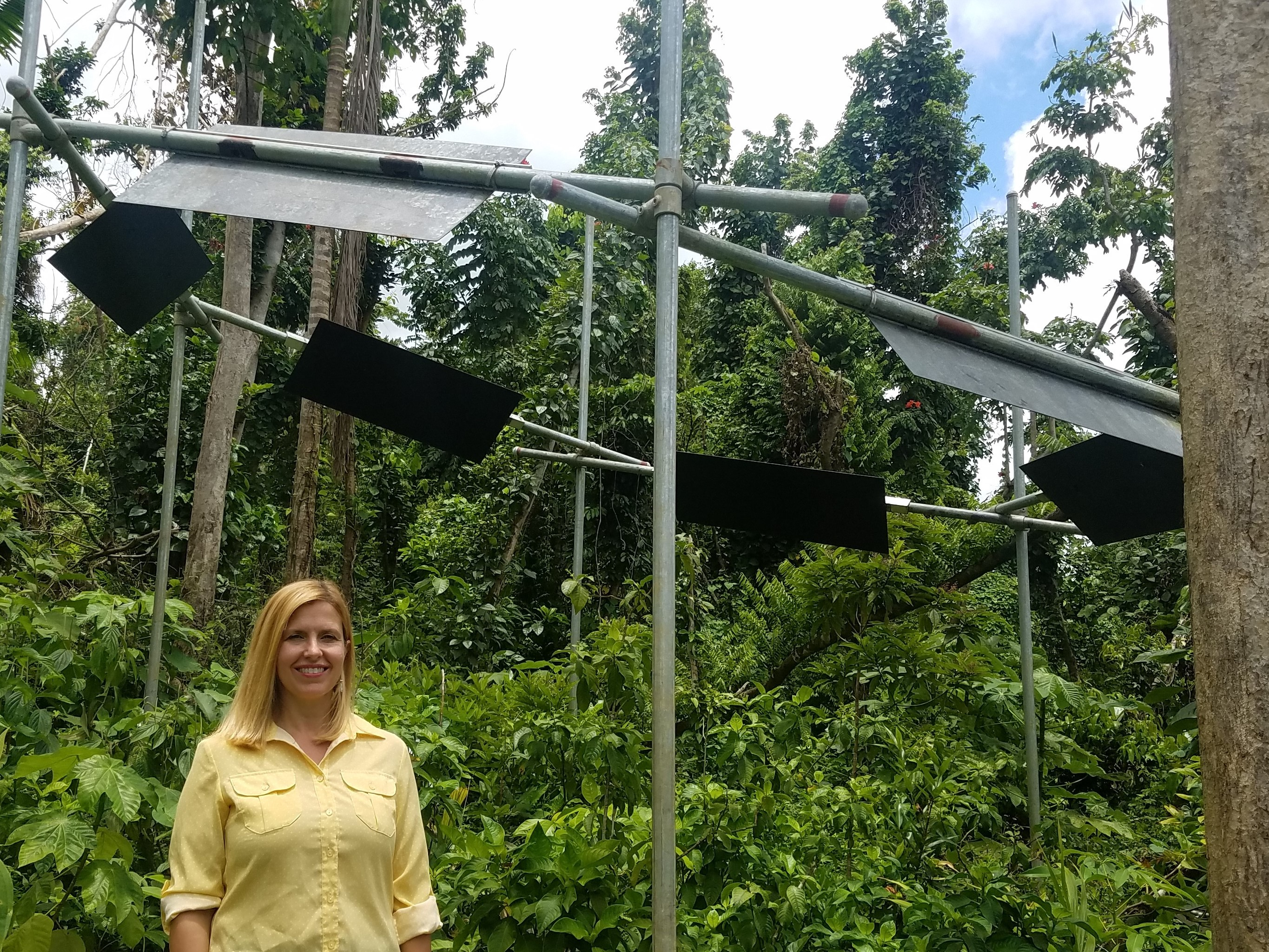
- Education: B.S. in Ecology, Evolution and Conservation Biology, M.S. in Environmental Sciences, Ph.D. in Environmental Sciences
- Employer: U.S. Forest Service
- Awards: Exploratory Research Award and Moore Research Award
- Website: https://www.tanawood.net/index.html

Tana Elaine Wood is a biogeochemist and ecosystem scientist with a focus in land-use and climate change. Her research is focused on looking into how these issues affect tropical forested ecosystems and particularly focuses on soil science and below ground research efforts.

== Early life ==
Wood attended the University of Texas Austin for her undergraduate studies. She received a B.S. in Ecology, Evolution and Conservation Biology in 1997. She received an M.S. in Environmental Sciences in 2003 from the University of Virginia. She later received a Ph.D. in Environmental Sciences from the University of Virginia in 2006.

== Career and research ==
Wood currently works as a Research Ecologist for the U.S. Forest Service. She also works for the Tropical Responses to Altered Climate Experiment as the first on-site scientist and leads research under the ground. Her graduate research was focused around the importance and effects of litter in tropical forests. It culminated with her thesis, The importance of litter to ecosystem function in a wet tropical forest; Environmental and physiological controls on nutrient resorption of nine tropical tree species. In 2007, she held a position as a postgraduate researcher at the University of California, Berkeley in the Department of Environmental Science, Policy, and Management. Her main field of expertise is in soil science of tropical forests. She is known for her research in the field of soil science as well as her writing on the issue of ecosystem manipulation. Her research has been funded by the United States Department of Agriculture Forest Service and Luquillo Long Term Ecological research as well as the United States Department of Energy.

=== Publications ===
Wood has published several highly cited scientific articles. Her work focuses on soil in tropical forests thus her published articles focus mostly on soil in tropical forests. Her works include research on increased experimenting in tropical forests, changing soil moisture and its effect on microbial content, the effect that tropical forests have on carbon regulation, variability in litter and weather patterns affects nutrients in the soil, and how nutrient cycles can be affected by environmental changes. Her articles include:

- Urgent need for warming experiments in tropical forests in the publication Global Change Biology.
- Pre-exposure to drought increases the resistance of tropical forest soil bacterial communities to extended drought in The ISME Journal.
- Tropical forest carbon balance in a warmer world: a critical review spanning microbial‐to ecosystem‐scale processes in the publication Biological Reviews.
- Rain forest nutrient cycling and productivity in response to large scale litter manipulation in the publication Ecology.
- Variation in leaf litter nutrients of a Costa Rican rain forest is related to precipitation in the publication Biogeochemistry.

== Awards and honors ==
- Exploratory Research Award from the University of Virginia, Department of Environmental Sciences (2001, 2003)
- Moore Research Award, from the University of Virginia, Department of Environmental Sciences (2002, 2004)
- National Oceanic and Atmospheric Administration Climate and Global Change Postdoctoral Fellowship.
