= Tana Oy =

Finnish environmental technology company

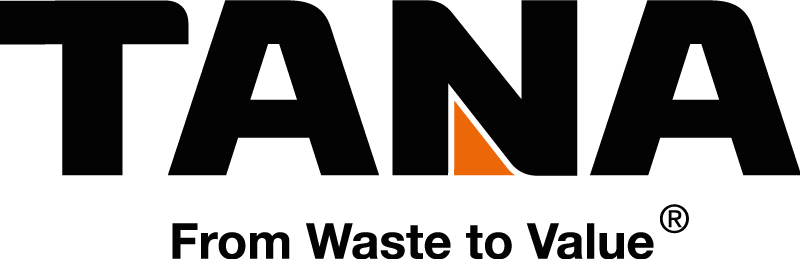
- Founded: 1971 in Jyväskylä, Finland
- Founder: Matti Sinkkonen
- Headquarters: Jyväskylä, Finland
- Area served: Worldwide
- Key people: Jari Mennala (CEO)
- Products: Landfill compactors, waste shredders, disc screens
- Website: tana.fi

Tana Oy is a Finnish environmental technology growth company founded in 1971. Tana specializes in machines and equipment for mechanical processing of solid waste. The company manufactures landfill compactors and recycling machinery. Tana is a pioneer of using digital systems and artificial intelligence in its equipment.

TANA machines are exported to more than 50 countries through a global distribution network including over 30 authorized Tana distributors. Majority of products manufactured by Tana Oy are being exported.

== History ==
The company's history dates back to the 1970s when Matti Sinkkonen established Tana-Jyrä Ltd. The company has also been known as Kone-Jyrä Ltd, Oy Tanacorp Ltd until 2003 the current owner renamed the company Tana Ltd (Tana Oy).

Kone-Jyrä Ltd was known for a cancelled Iraq deal. In the late 1980s, the Iraqi government wanted to buy 16 motorboats from the company, but due to the Gulf War, the deal was cancelled. A few of the boats were later used by the Finnish Society for the Saving of Shipwrecked Persons.

The word 'Tana' comes from the Finnish word 'tanakka', which is used in the sense of something being robust, reliable and durable. It refers to the modular structure of the TANA machines and their longevity. A Finnish word for compacting, 'tanata', comes from the TANA landfill compactors and is nowadays used to describe crushing and compacting waste.

== Offices ==
Throughout its history, the company has had its headquarters in Jyväskylä, Finland. In 2015, the company headquarters were moved from Vaajakoski, Jyväskylä, to the old Schauman castle in Lutakko, Jyväskylä. The Schauman Castle was originally built for the head of the Schauman plywood factory owner Bruno Krook, and his family. The castle was designed by Gunnar Wahlroos.

Tana Oy's additional offices are Tana Tampere Office in Technopolis Yliopistonrinne in Tampere, Finland, Tana Research & Development Centre in Jyväskylä, Finland and Tana Germany Office in Wiesbaden, Germany.

== Recognition ==
In 2024, Dun & Bradstreet placed the company in its lowest risk category, "1st category minimal risk". The requirements for getting into the lowest risk category are, e.g. undisputed creditworthiness and economic growth. Tana Oy was also awarded the AAA highest credit rating by Dun&Bradstreet. An AAA credit rating requires established operations, a positive or non-negative background and payment method, and good finances. Tana Oy worked together with Medita Communication Ltd on a sustainability & ESG communications project and got shortlisted in the esteemed Finnish Comms Awards by Marketing Finland, in the Sustainability Comms category.

In August 2023, Tana Oy received the Kasvaja 2023 (Grower 2023) certificate issued by Kauppalehti for established operations and stable growth. Tana Oy also received the Kestomenestyjä 2019–2023 (Continuous Achiever 2023) certificate, which means that, based on key figure comparisons, the company has been ranked among the best companies both among all Finnish companies and among the best companies in its industry for five consecutive years.

Hallituspartnerit-network's Kultainen Nuija (golden gavel) Top 3 -finalist. Kultainen Nuija is an annual award given to a Finnish company in recognition of excellence in governance.

Suomen Yrittäjät (Entrepreneurs of Finland) organization and insurance company Fennia awarded the 2021 National Entrepreneurship Award to the chairman of the Board of Tana Oy, Kari Kangas, as well as to Dermoshop Oy, E. Hartikainen Oy, and Heikkinen Yhtiöt Oy.

Tana Oy received the Kasvaja 2020 (Grower 2020) and Menestyjä 2020 (Achiever 2020) certificates issued by Kauppalehti for established operations, stable growth and good results and profitability.

The Central Finland Entrepreneur of the Year 2020 award was presented to the chairman of the Board of Tana Oy, Kari Kangas.

In 2019, Suomalaisen Työn Liitto (Finnish Labor Union) awarded Tana Oy's products with the Avainlippu symbol (Key Flag Symbol).

Tana Oy was chosen in Business Finland's Sampo-campaign. The Sampo-campaign wants to further develop the operations of the manufacturing industry. The campaign is aimed at companies of all sizes in the manufacturing industry.
