= Tana, Guinea =

Village in Guinea

Coordinates: 9°20′N 13°09′W

Tana is a small rural village in Guinea, nor far from the border with Sierra Leone. As of November 2015, the area around Tana was the last place in West Africa to still be affected by the West African Ebola virus disease epidemic. The village was visited by the Guinean prime minister Mohamed Said Fofana in an attempt to enlist local support in the effort against the disease.
