= Twine (marketplace) =

Online marketplace

- Company type: Private Company
- Website type: Marketplace & Social Network Platform
- Available in: English
- Founded: 2014
- Headquarters: Manchester, United Kingdom
- Area served: Worldwide
- Website: www.twine.net
- Registration: Required
- Launched: January 2016

Twine is an online marketplace and network that connects freelancers in design, software engineering, marketing, music and creative expertise to companies. Twine rebranded from Clowdy in January 2016 when it re-launched as a marketplace.

Twine has been described as the LinkedIn of the creative industries. It allows creative freelancers to tag collaborators on a creative project, enabling all those who worked on it to receive credit and build a portfolio.

The site serves the same interface and platform for both of its users, namely freelancers (software engineers, marketers, designers, content creators, musicians, filmmakers, animators), and buyers who commission the users services. Twine users can post project briefs that freelancers can work on. They also can follow other users of the site and this forms the backbone of the sharing element of the site.

Twine's office is located in Manchester, UK.

In July 2014, Twine, was voted as Winner of the UK Creative Business Cup.
