= Anthony O'Sullivan (hurler) =

Irish hurler

Personal information
- Native name: Antaine Ó Súilleabháin (Irish)
- Born: 24 November 1966 (age 59) Bishopstown, Cork, Ireland
- Occupation: Insurance representative
- Height: 6 ft 1 in (185 cm)

Sport
- Sport: Hurling
- Position: Right wing-forward
Club
- Years: Club
- Bishopstown
Club titles
- Cork titles: 0
College
- Years: College
- University College Cork
College titles
- Fitzgibbon titles: 2
Inter-county*
Years	County	Apps (scores)
1989-1990	Cork	3 (0-03)
Inter-county titles
- Munster titles: 1
- All-Irelands: 1
- NHL: 0
- All Stars: 0
- *Inter County team apps and scores correct as of 14:58, 7 April 2019.

Anthony O'Sullivan (born 24 November 1966) is an Irish retired hurler who played for Cork Championship club Bishopstown. He played for the Cork senior hurling team for one season, during which time he usually lined out as a right wing-forward.

== Honours ==
University College Cork

- Fitzgibbon Cup (2): 1988, 1990

Bishopstown

- Cork Intermediate Hurling Championship (1): 1992

Cork

- All-Ireland Senior Hurling Championship (1): 1990
- Munster Senior Hurling Championship (1): 1990
