= Trine Tsouderos =

American journalist

- Occupation: Journalist
- Known for: Award-winning reporting on dubious autism therapies
- Spouse: Jon Yates

Trine Tsouderos is a journalist who formerly wrote for the Chicago Tribune, beginning in 2003, prior to which she wrote for People, the Tennessean, and the Wilson Daily Times (where she began her career as a journalist in 1995).

In 2013, Tsouderos joined PwC's healthcare think tank, Health Research Institute, as a director; in 2021, she was named leader of the institute and also began working as a consultant working on COVID and influenza vaccine projects with pharmaceutical companies. Tsouderos also was co-creator and co-host of PwC's healthcare podcast, Next in Health, and recorded nearly 80 episodes. In 2022, Tsouderos left PwC to work on a master's degree in the history of medicine at Johns Hopkins University School of Medicine.

== Reporting ==
Tsouderos is known for authoring articles about controversial autism therapies such as BDTH2, chelation therapy and hyperbaric oxygen therapy. Working with Patricia Callahan, she produced the Chicago Tribune series Dubious Medicine. In 2010, the series received an award for excellence in health care journalism by the Association of Health Care Journalists and honorable mention for a Casey Medal for Meritorious Journalism. In 2011, the Chicago Journalists Association awarded Tsouderos and Callahan the Sarah Brown Boyden for "Revelations about how quackery is thriving in modern medicine."

Tsouderos also covered Anjum Usman, a doctor in Naperville, Illinois who critics say prescribes supplements and treatments for autistic children which were based in part on inappropriate lab testing. Another of her articles focused on the suspension of Mark Geier's medical license, as well as, more generally, his use of Lupron to treat autistic children. Other topics of her reporting include the potential role of XMRV in the etiology of chronic fatigue syndrome, as well as the efficacy of anti-aging creams.

In 2012, Tsouderos left the Chicago Tribune and transitioned to public relations, working for GolinHarris as healthcare media director.

== Personal life ==
Tsouderos is married to Jon Yates, who also wrote for the Chicago Tribune and later joined her at PwC. They have two children.
