= Ralph Waldo Trine =

American New Thought writer

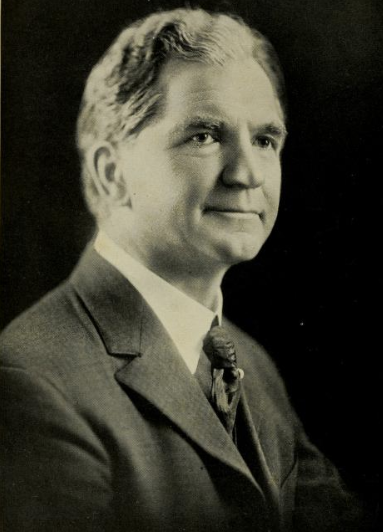
- Born: 9 September 1866; Mount Morris, Illinois
- Died: 22 February 1958; Claremont, California
- Occupation: Writer
- Spouse: Grace Steele Hyde Trine

Ralph Waldo Trine (9 September 1866 – 22 February 1958) was an American New Thought writer, philosopher and animal welfare activist.

== Biography ==
Trine was born in Mount Morris, Illinois to Ellen E. Newcomer and Samuel G. Trine. He was educated at Knox College where he graduated A.B. in 1891. He studied history and political science at Johns Hopkins University and obtained his A.M. from Knox College in 1893.

Trine married Grace Steele Hyde and they had one son. As a young man he worked as a correspondent for the Boston Evening Transcript. During this time he became influenced by the idealistic philosophy of Ralph Waldo Emerson. Trine was also influenced by George Herron's Christian socialism. Trine's spiritual views have been described as being a mixture of Buddhism, pantheism, spiritualism, transcendentalism, Christian socialism, and neo-Vedanta philosophy.

Trine authored In Tune with the Infinite which has remained the most popular publication in the New Thought movement. Translated into 20 languages, the book articulates Trine's belief that aligning oneself with the universal spirit, or infinite life, can lead to inner peace, health, and success. He emphasized the transformative power of positive thinking, faith, and moral character over material ambition. Unlike most other New Thought writers, Trine did not resort to mental money making advice and has been described as "one of the rare purists whose books were guileless optimism". In the 1920s, Trine became associated with Henry Ford and published some of their conversations in The Power that Wins, illustrating how his ideas resonated with influential public figures.

Trine lived and worked on a fruit farm in Croton-on-Hudson, New York.

== Animal welfare ==
Trine was a vegetarian for ethical reasons and supported animal welfare. His book Every Living Creature called for kindness to animals and advocated a vegetarian diet. He was the director of the American Humane Education Society and the Massachusetts Society for the Prevention of Cruelty to Animals.

== Selected publications ==
- In Tune with the Infinite, T. Y. Crowell & Company, 1897
- Every Living Creature, T. Y. Crowell & Company, 1899
- The Greatest Thing Ever Known, T. Y. Crowell & Company, 1898
- In the Fire of the Heart, McClure, Philips & Co, 1906
- The Wayfarer On The Open Road, George Bell and Sons, 1908
- My Philosophy and My Religion, Dodd, Mead & Company, 1921
- The Power that Wins, The Bobbs-Merrill Company, 1929

== In Tune With The Infinite ==
In In Tune With The Infinite, Trine's core beliefs are clearly expressed. One of his central ideas is that the most important fact of human life is coming into a conscious and vital realization of one's oneness with Infinite Life, and opening oneself to this divine inflow. Instead of promoting material success, Trine focused on cultivating moral character and inner harmony. For him, success came not from striving for wealth, but from living in accordance with divine order. Trine argued that the mind held the real power: by thinking positively and harmonizing one's thoughts with the Infinite, individuals could transform both their inner life and external circumstances. Trine's work is deeply invested in mind-body connections, arguing that physical health can even be achieved through spiritual alignment and mental clarity. Within the text, Trine articulates that access to divine truth is available to all, not solely religious elites. In this manner, he made spiritual insight a part of everyday life. Scholars have noted that the power of In Tune With The Infinite lies within its optimistic, emotionally edifying vision of life. His idealism is described as vague yet appealing, offering spiritual comfort.
