= Tane =

Tane or Tāne may refer to:

== People ==
- Tane Ikai (1879–1995), a Japanese supercentenarian
- Tané Matsukata (1918–1989), founder of Nishimachi International School in Azabu, Tokyo
- Tané McClure (born 1958), an American singer and actress
- Tane Nikolov (1873–1947), a Bulgarian revolutionary
- Tane Norton (1942–2023), a New Zealand rugby union player
- Tomoko Tane (born 1961), Japanese singer, songwriter and arranger
- Tane Topia (born 1976), a New Zealand former cricketer
- Tane Tuʻipulotu (born 1981), a former rugby union player

== Places ==
- Tane (Bora Bora), a private island in the lagoon of Bora Bora
- Tane Province, an old province of Japan in the area of Kagoshima Prefecture

== Other ==
- Tāne, the god of forests and of birds in Māori mythology
- Tāne Mahuta, a giant kauri tree in the Waipoua Forest
- Tane-rore, in Maori mythology is the personification of shimmering air as he performs a haka for his mother Hine-raumati.
