= Tein (company) =

TEIN, INC.
- Trade name: Tein
- Native name: 株式会社テイン
- Romanized name: Tein, inku.
- Company type: Joint-stock company
- Industry: Automotive
- Founded: June 2, 1966; 60 years ago
- Headquarters: Yokohama, Kanagawa, Japan
- Website: www.tein.co.jp/e/index.html

TEIN, INC. is a suspension manufacturing and sales company for passenger cars and motor sports cars headquartered in Yokohama, Kanagawa Prefecture.

Regarding car harmonics, it is compatible with all types of cars, from sports cars to compact cars, minivans, and SUVs, but if it is not in the existing lineup such as old cars and minor models, it can be manufactured by one-off (custom order). In 2017, the genuine shape shock absorber "Endura Pro/Endura Pro PLUS", which is a global strategic product, was released.
