= Tripoli, Greece =

City in the Peloponnese, Greece

Tripoli Τρίπολη
- Municipality
- Clockwise from top: Panoramic view of the City of Tripoli, Saint Basil Cathedral in downtown Tripoli, Railway Station of Tripoli, Malliaropoulio Municipal Theater, and the Court House of Tripoli with the Areos Square in front of it.
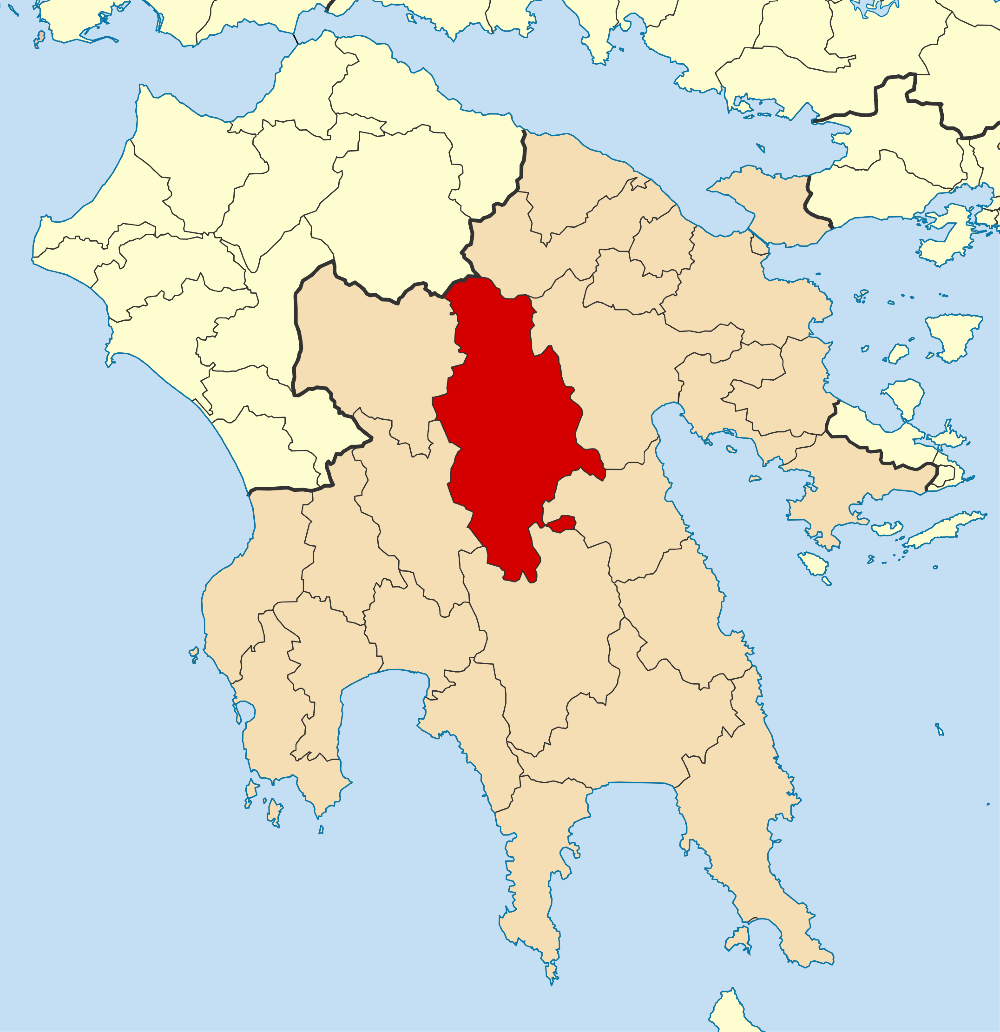

- Location within Greece
- Coordinates: 37°31′N 22°23′E
- Country: Greece
- Administrative region: Peloponnese
- Regional unit: Arcadia

Government
  - Mayor: Konstantinos Tzioumis (since 2019)

Area
  - Municipality: 1,475.8 km^{2} (569.8 sq mi)
  - Municipal unit: 119.3 km^{2} (46.1 sq mi)
- Elevation: 655 m (2,149 ft)

Population (2021)
  - Municipality: 44,165
  - Density: 29.926/km^{2} (77.508/sq mi)
  - Municipal unit: 33,026
  - Municipal unit density: 276.8/km^{2} (717.0/sq mi)
  - Community: 30,448
- Time zone: UTC+2 (EET)
  - Summer (DST): UTC+3 (EEST)
- Postal code: 221 00
- Area code: 2710
- Website: www.tripolis.gr

Tripoli (Greek: Τρίπολη, romanized: Trípoli; Katharevousa: Τρίπολις, romanized: Trípolis) is a city in the central part of the Peloponnese, in Greece. It is the capital of the Peloponnese region as well as of the regional unit of Arcadia. The homonymous municipality had 44,165 inhabitants in 2021.

== Names and etymology ==
In the Middle Ages, the place was known as Drobolitsa, Droboltsá, or Dorboglitza, either from the Greek Hydropolitsa, 'Water City' or perhaps from the South Slavic for 'Plain of Oaks'. The association made by 18th- and 19th-century scholars with the idea of the "three cities" (Τρίπολις, τρεις πόλεις "three cities": variously Callia, Dipoena and Nonacris, mentioned by Pausanias without geographical context, or Tegea, Mantineia and Pallantium, or Mouchli, Tegea and Mantineia or Nestani, Mouchli and Thana), were considered paretymologies by G.C. Miles.

An Italian geographical atlas of 1687 notes the fort of Goriza e Mandi et Dorbogliza; a subsequent Italian geographical dictionary of 1827 attributes the name Dorbogliza to the ruins of Mantineia (Mandi) and states that it is located north of Tripolizza. In 1463, it was spelled Droboliza and existed in ruins. The Ottoman Turks would later refer to the town and district as Tripoliça, Trepoliça, and Trapoliça.

== History ==
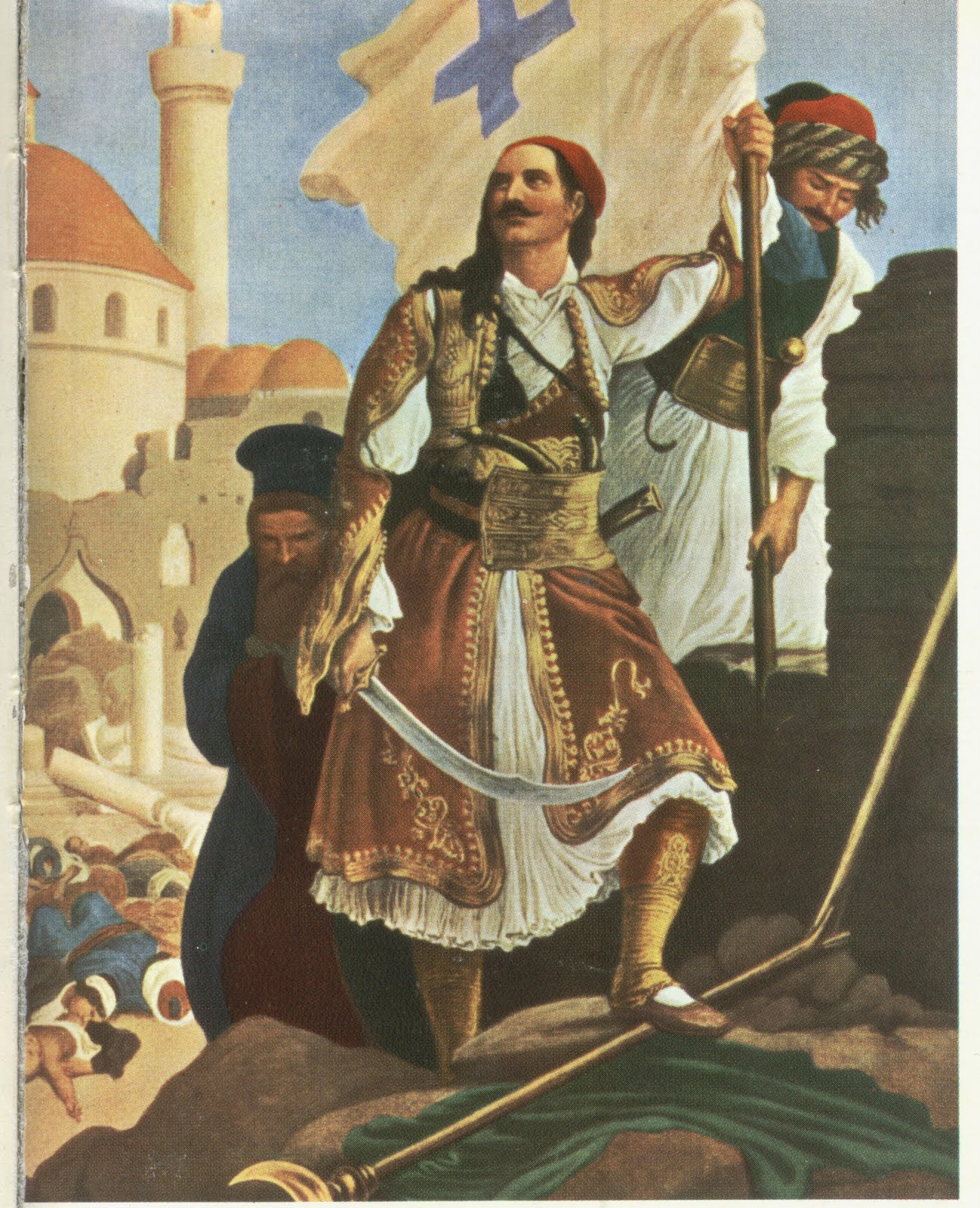
"Commander Panagiotis Kefalas plants the flag of Liberty upon the walls of Tripolizza, after the Siege of Tripolitsa" by Peter von Hess

Little is known about Drobolitza, but it is included in a list of abandoned Byzantine sites from 1467, corresponding with the years after Mehmed's conquest of this part of Greece. However, following the Ottoman conquest of Morea, it seems that the cultural and administrative centre of the Tegean plain was moved from Mouchli to Drobolitza. This development occurred some years after the conquest, sometime after 1467. After 1540, the focus seems to have changed from the fortress itself, to the settlement below it called Tarabluca, that would be the next political centre of the plain. French archaeologist visited the ruins of Tarabluca in 1829, and could still observe the ruins of Drobolitza at this time.

In spring 1770 during a Greek uprising known as Orlov Revolt, the revolutionary armies were halted out of Tripolitsa. In retaliation for the Greek uprising, Albanian mercenaries of the Ottomans slaughtered 3,000 Greeks in a few hours upon entering the city. Total massacre and destruction of the city was avoided after intervention of Osman bey, leader of the Albanian mercenaries.

Before the Greek War of Independence, under the Ottoman name of "Tripoliçe", it was one of the Ottoman administrative centers in the Peloponnese (the Morea Eyalet, often called "pashalik of Tripolitsa") and had large Muslim (mainly Turkish and Albanian) and Jewish populations. Tripolis was one of the main targets of the Greek insurgents in the Greek War of Independence, who stormed it on 17 October 1821, following the bloody siege of Tripolitsa, and exterminated the Muslim populations.

Ibrahim Pasha retook the city on June 22, 1825, after it had been abandoned by the Greeks. Before he evacuated the Peloponnese in early 1828, he destroyed the city and tore down its walls.

After the independent Greek state was established in 1830, the old Ottoman buildings of Tripolizza, such as the walls, were completely destroyed or demolished.

Tripoli was renamed and rebuilt and was developed as one of the main cities of the Kingdom of Greece, serving as the capital of the Arcadia district. During the 19th and the 20th centuries the city emerged to be the administrative, economic, commercial and transportation center of central and south Peloponnese.

== Geography and climate ==
The city of Tripoli has a hot-summer Mediterranean climate (Köppen: Csa). Ιt is located in the center of the Peloponnese, at the western border of a large basin (a polje at about 650 m in altitude, a length of ca. 30 km and a width between 12,5 and 2,5 km). The city is today the capital of the regional unit Arcadia (residents, city alone, ca. 30 000, district with hinterland ca. 47500, 2011 Greek census). At its west the city borders the thickly wooded mountain-area “Mainalo”. The Tripoli Basin has gradually been rainwater regulated (mainly after 1945) and turned into farmland. In the southwest floods, which appear in the basin occasionally after rainy winters, as in 2003, formed the temporary Lake Taka. This lake was regulated by a new pond, to retain water for irrigation.

Because of its inland location and high altitude, Tripoli's climate has some continental characteristics, such as some very cold lows during the winter months. Summer temperatures can exceed 38 °C (100 °F) and in winter temperatures below −10 °C (14 °F) have been observed on several occasions. Snow or sleet can occur several times between November and early April.

Its main plazas are aligned with the main street and with a highway linking to Pyrgos and Patras. One of them is named Kennedy, the other is named Georgiou B' (George II). The southern part has its main street named Washington. The main section of the city is enclosed around the castle walls that were built during the Ottoman occupation of Greece. An industrial park has been built in the southwest.

Climate data for Tripolis (1991–2020)
Month	Jan	Feb	Mar	Apr	May	Jun	Jul	Aug	Sep	Oct	Nov	Dec	Year
Record high °C (°F)	21.0 (69.8)	24.2 (75.6)	32.0 (89.6)	33.6 (92.5)	38.0 (100.4)	40.4 (104.7)	42.4 (108.3)	43.0 (109.4)	38.6 (101.5)	37.0 (98.6)	34.0 (93.2)	27.0 (80.6)	43.0 (109.4)
Mean daily maximum °C (°F)	9.8 (49.6)	10.7 (51.3)	14.0 (57.2)	18.0 (64.4)	23.4 (74.1)	28.5 (83.3)	31.2 (88.2)	31.3 (88.3)	26.5 (79.7)	21.4 (70.5)	15.4 (59.7)	10.6 (51.1)	20.1 (68.1)
Daily mean °C (°F)	5.0 (41.0)	5.7 (42.3)	8.1 (46.6)	11.8 (53.2)	17.2 (63.0)	22.2 (72.0)	24.7 (76.5)	24.2 (75.6)	19.7 (67.5)	14.6 (58.3)	9.9 (49.8)	6.5 (43.7)	14.1 (57.5)
Mean daily minimum °C (°F)	0.3 (32.5)	0.9 (33.6)	2.5 (36.5)	4.8 (40.6)	8.6 (47.5)	12.3 (54.1)	14.7 (58.5)	15.0 (59.0)	11.4 (52.5)	8.0 (46.4)	4.5 (40.1)	1.8 (35.2)	7.1 (44.7)
Record low °C (°F)	−17.0 (1.4)	−15.8 (3.6)	−16.0 (3.2)	−7.2 (19.0)	−5.4 (22.3)	1.0 (33.8)	6.2 (43.2)	3.4 (38.1)	−3.2 (26.2)	−6.0 (21.2)	−9.8 (14.4)	−14.2 (6.4)	−17.0 (1.4)
Average precipitation mm (inches)	103.6 (4.08)	89.0 (3.50)	74.8 (2.94)	53.9 (2.12)	37.6 (1.48)	23.3 (0.92)	19.4 (0.76)	19.3 (0.76)	29.2 (1.15)	66.1 (2.60)	108.8 (4.28)	125.8 (4.95)	750.8 (29.54)
Average precipitation days	13.7	12.8	12.5	11.5	9.2	6.1	4.0	3.3	4.8	9.8	11.9	15.6	115.2
Average relative humidity (%)	76.1	74.4	69.3	62.5	57.0	47.4	44.1	45.9	54.5	75.4	77.4	77.5	63.5
Mean monthly sunshine hours	117.2	128.6	178.9	210.9	264.1	295.3	321.7	288.9	225.3	171.3	138.4	96.7	2,437.3
Source: Info Climat (sun 1991-2020, extremes-present)

== Surrounding area and geology ==
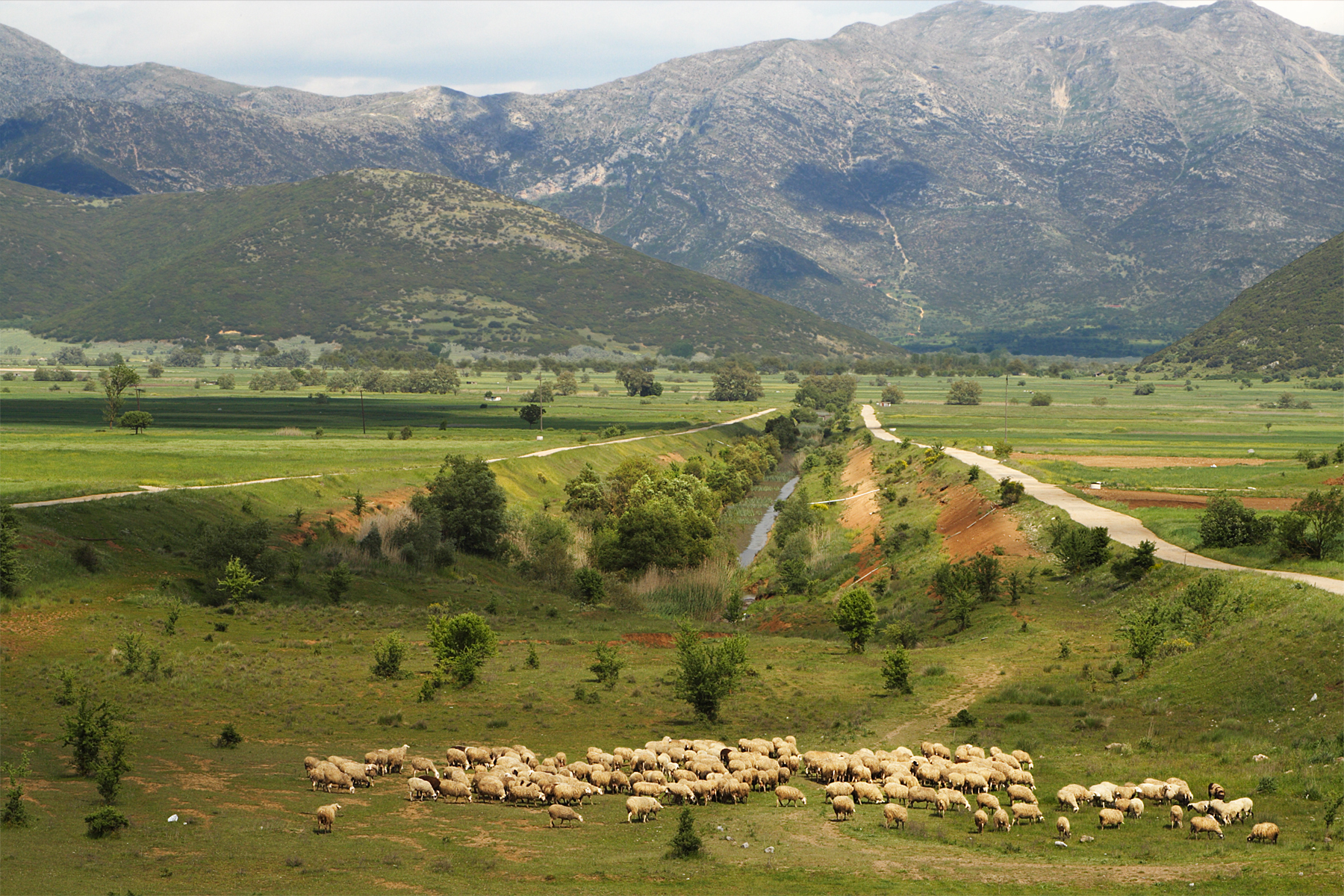
Another basin in Tripolis municipal unit Levidi (basin of the communities “Vlacherna/Hotoussa/Kandila”), ca. 25 km north of Tripoli

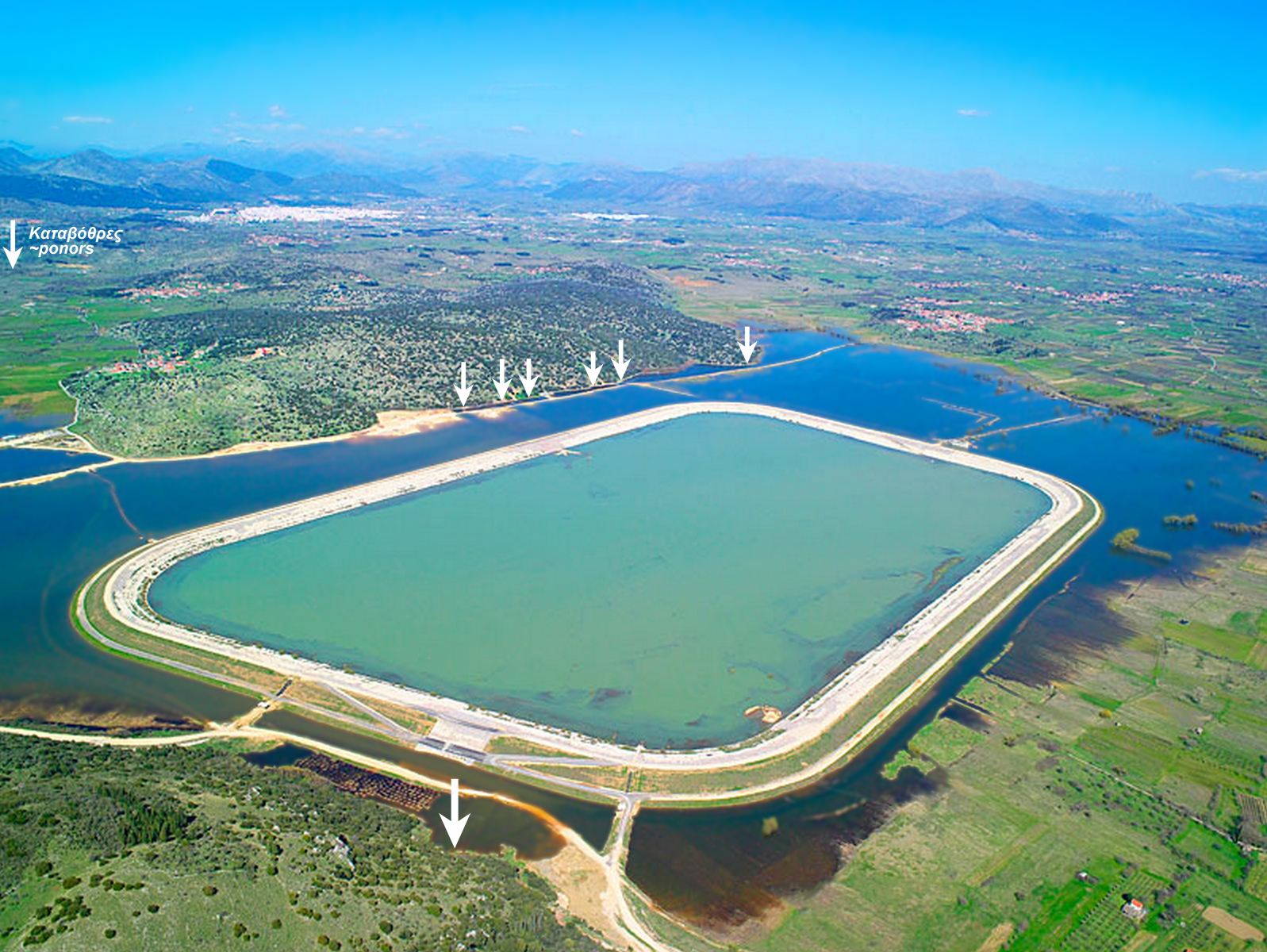
Pond Taka, floods around and ponors of former temporary Lake Taka. Tripoli in the far back

In the large Tripoli Basin and in vast parts of the wider geological formations of the Arcadian Highland tectonics in the dominant carbonate rock "Tripoliza" of the Peloponnese developed a special topography: There are several plains, "intra mountainous basins", even "closed basins": Besides small basins, there are the Tripoli-Basin, the "Argon Pedion" (an almost separated side basin in the northeast of Tripoli), the Basin of Levidi and the Basin of Vlacherna Arcadia/Hotoussa/Kandila).

The peculiarity of all plains and basins in Arcadia is the coincidence with intensive karstification: Water seeps into the underground, rather than eroding and draining the topography by surface waterways. All drainage runs through ponors (in Greek: καταβόθρες) and subterranean waterways. There are 45 ponors in the above named basins. There are 7 ponors around Lake Taka. When winter rains are heavy, the ground is flooded or temporary lakes form, even today, as drainage through ponors is often slow which causes land cultivation delays.

== Municipality ==
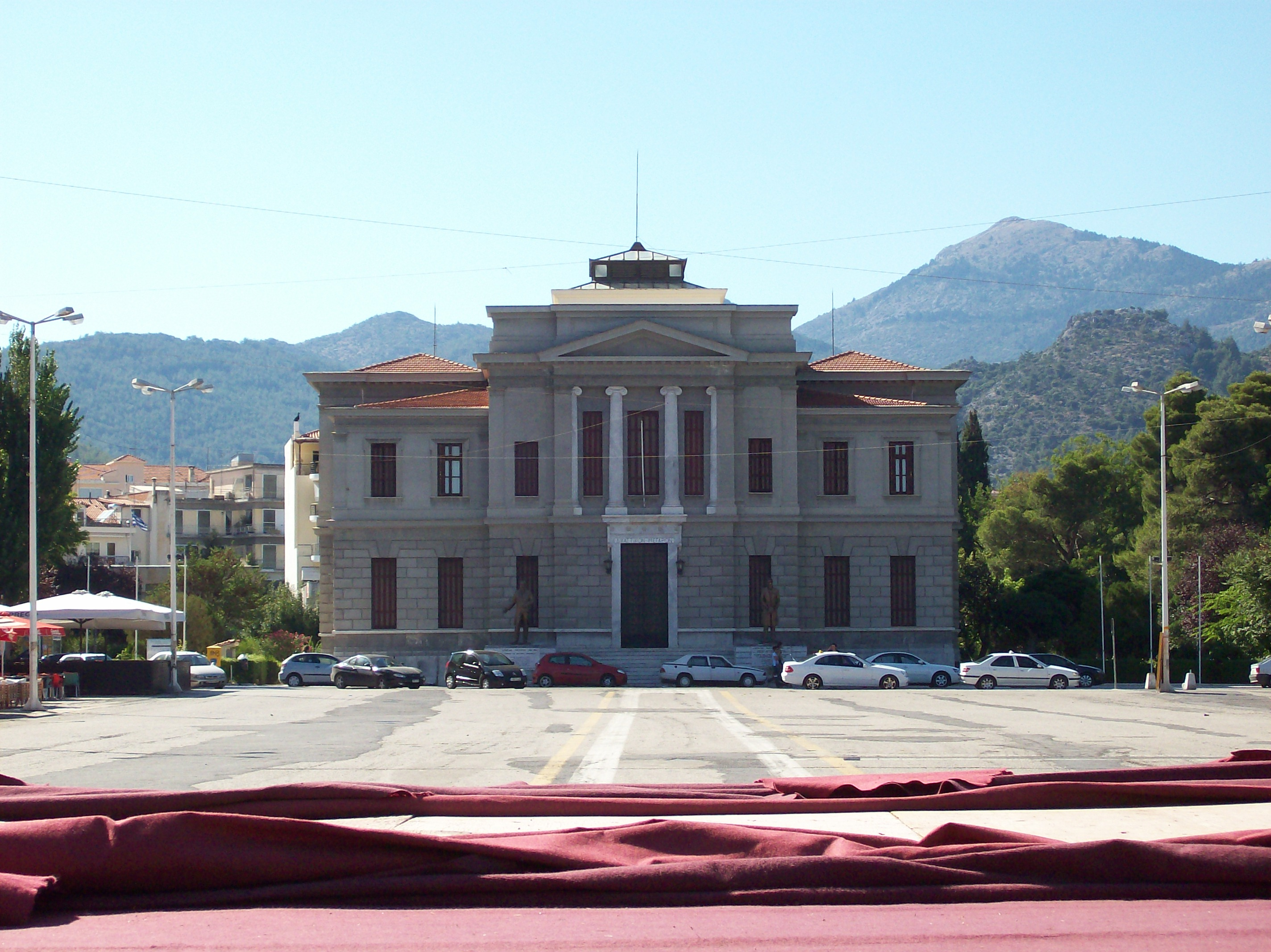
Areos Square with the Court House, designed by Ernst Ziller

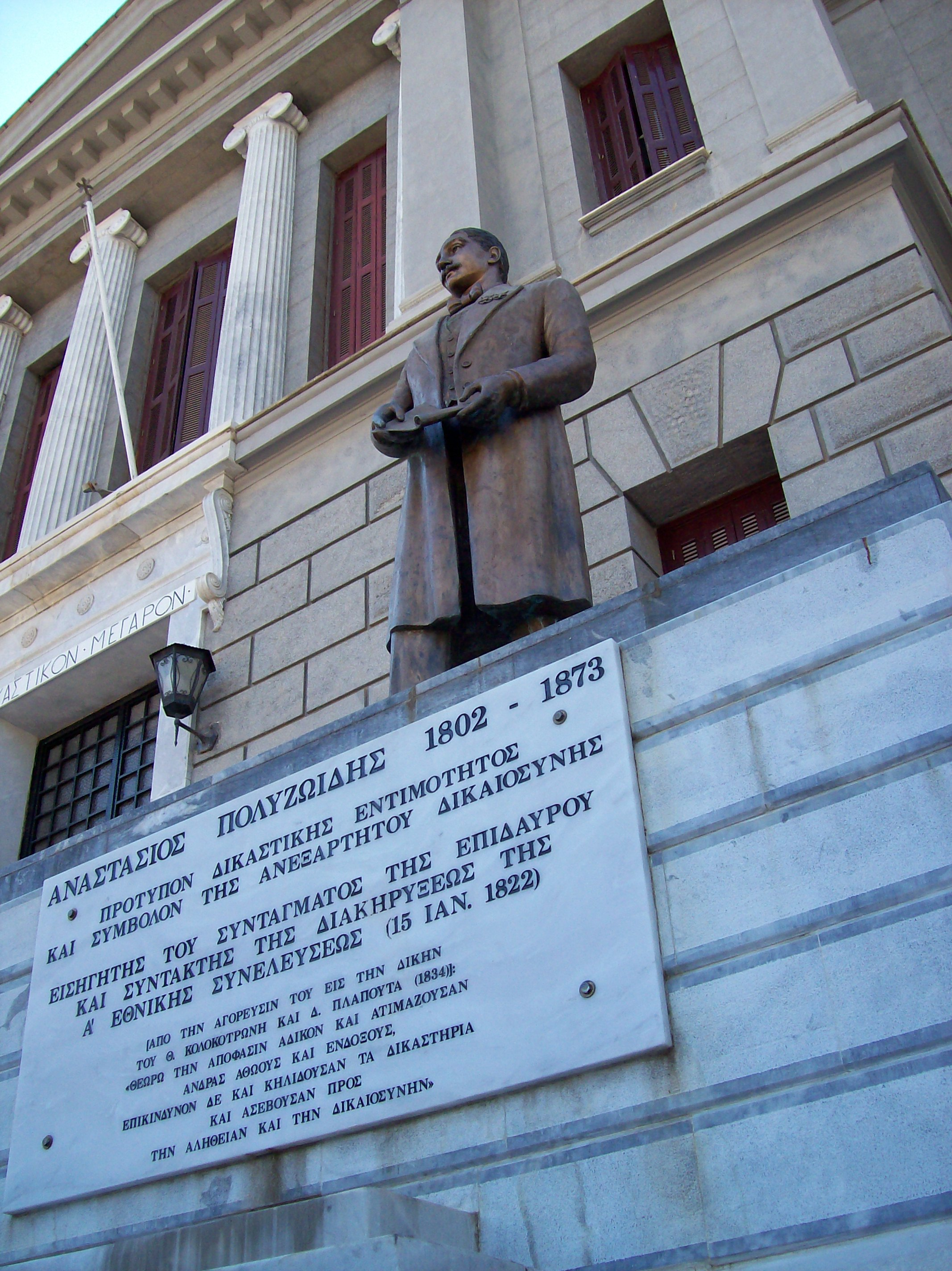
Close-up view of the statue of Anastasios Polyzoidis in front of the Court House.

The municipality of Tripoli was formed at the 2011 local government reform by merging these 8 former municipalities, that became municipal units:

- Falanthos
- Korythio
- Levidi
- Mantineia
- Skiritida
- Tegea
- Tripoli
- Valtetsi

The municipality has an area of 1,475.805 km^{2}, the municipal unit 119.287 km^{2}.

=== Subdivisions ===
The municipal unit of Tripoli is subdivided into these communities:

- Agios Vasileios
- Agios Konstantinos
- Evandro
- Makri
- Merkovouni
- Pallantio
- Pelagos
- Perthori
- Skopi
- Thanas
- Tripoli

== Education ==
Tripoli is the flagship campus of the University of the Peloponnese, founded in 2000.

UoP Tripoli is the location of the School of Economy, Management and Informatics, composed of the Department of Economics and the Department of Informatics and Telecommunications.

== Transportation ==
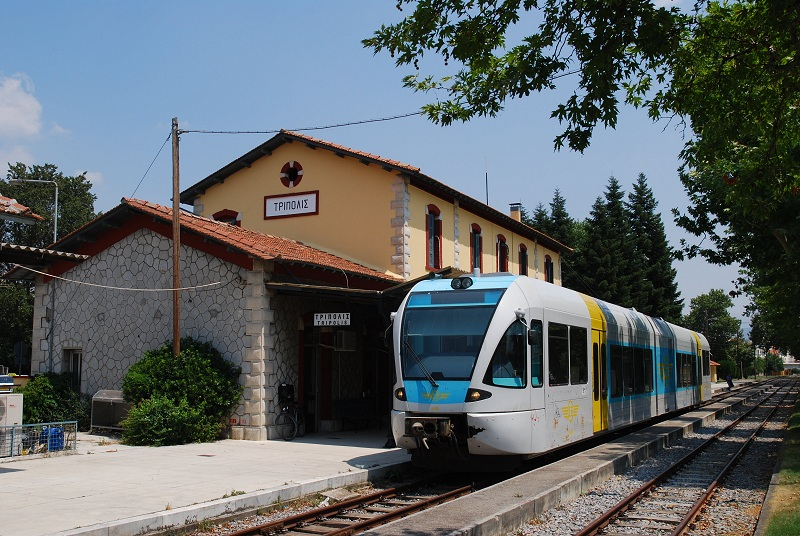
Tripoli's railway station.

Because it is at the centre of the Peloponnese, Tripolis is a transportation hub. Corinth is 75 kilometres (47 miles) NE, Pyrgos 145 kilometres (90 mi) W, Patras 144 km (89 mi) NW, Kalamata 65 km (40 mi) SW, and Sparti 60 km (37 mi) S.

Tripoli is mainly accessed from Athens and the rest of Greece through the A7 toll motorway, which runs northbound towards Corinth and southbound to Kalamata. An alternative toll-free route is the EO7 national road, which used to be the main highway to Tripoli before the construction of the motorway. The city is also accessed by the EO74 and EO76 from Pyrgos, and the EO39 from Sparta.

Tripoli is served by the metre gauge railway line from Corinth to Kalamata of the Hellenic Railways Organisation (OSE). The line was renovated and passenger services to Árgos and Corinth, which had been suspended for a few years, were reinstated in 2009. However, in December 2010 services ceased again due to the general suspension of railway services in the Peloponnese.

== Military ==
Tripoli is home to the two largest Armed Forces bootcamps in Greece, one operated by the Hellenic Army and one by the Hellenic Air Force: the 251st Army Training Battalion and the 124th Basic Training Wing.

== Sports ==
Tripoli hosts three sport clubs with presence in the higher national divisions in Greek football and basketball. These clubs are shown below.

Sport clubs based in Tripoli
Club	Founded	Sports	Achievements
Panarkadikos F.C.	1927	Football	Earlier presence in Beta Ethniki
Asteras Tripolis	1931	Football	Presence in Super League Greece
Arkadikos B.C.	1976	Basketball	Presence in A2 Ethniki

== In popular culture ==
The siege of Tripolitsa was made famous in the folk (Δημοτικό) song "40 παλικάρια από την Λιβαδειά" (Forty lads from Livadeia)

== Historical population ==
Year	Community	Municipal unit	Municipality
1981	21,337	–	–
1991	22,429	26,432	–
2001	25,520	28,976	–
2011	30,912	33,785	47,254
2021	30,448	33,026	44,165

== Notable people ==
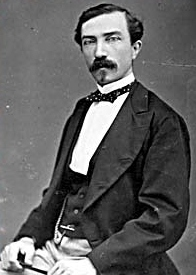
Epameinontas Deligeorgis

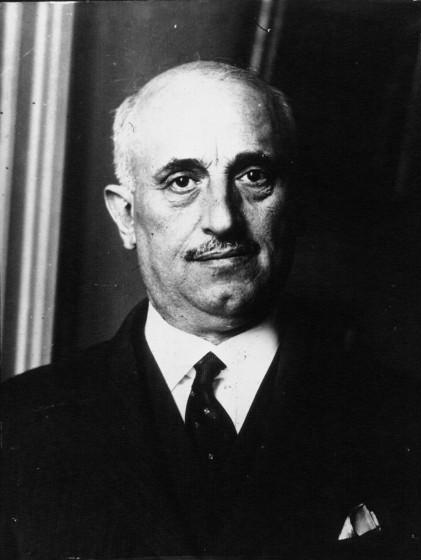
Alexandros Papanastasiou

- Theodoros Kolokotronis (3 April 1770 – 4 February 1843), general and pre-eminent leader of the Greek War of Independence
- Epameinontas Deligeorgis (1829–1879), Prime Minister of Greece
- Nikos Floros, sculptor
- Konstantinos Georgakopoulos (1890–1978), lawyer and politician, Prime Minister of Greece
- Kostas Karyotakis (1896–1928), poet
- Ioannis Kossos, sculptor
- Yiannis Kouros (1956), ultramarathon runner
- Konstantinos Manetas (1879–1960), general and politician
- Theodoros Manetas (1881–1947), general and politician
- Alexandros Papanastasiou (1876–1936), politician and sociologist, Prime Minister of Greece
- Dr. Giorgos Peponis, medical practitioner, sports administrator and former captain of the Australian Rugby League team was born in the city in 1953
- Petros Tatoulis (1953), politician
- Semni Karouzou (1897–1994), archaeologist and curator

== Twin towns – sister cities ==
Tripoli, Greece is twinned with:

- Peine, Germany
- Arcadia, California, United States

== Gallery ==
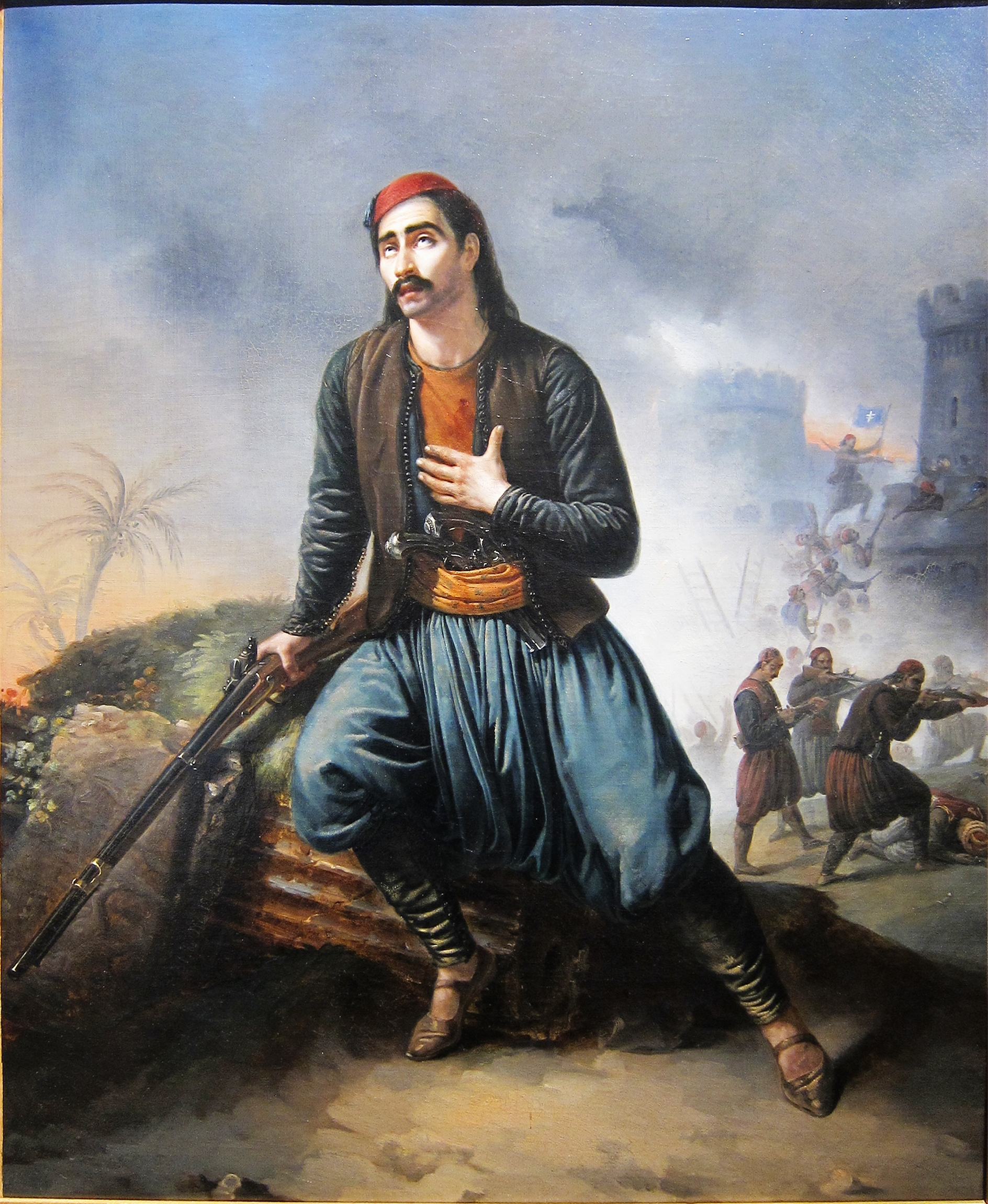
"Death of a Greek soldier during the siege of Tripolizza" by Henri Serrur

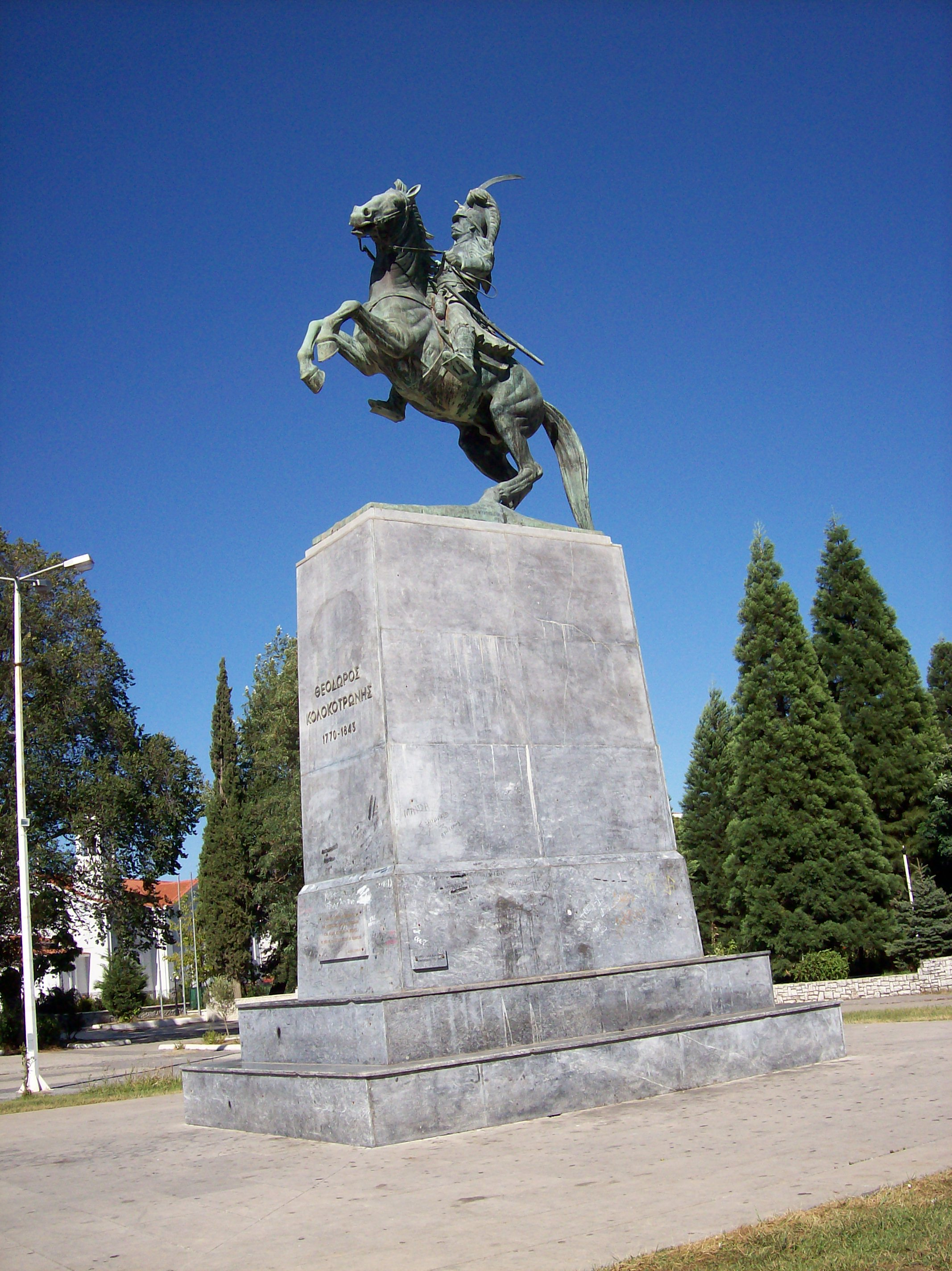
A statue of Theodoros Kolokotronis

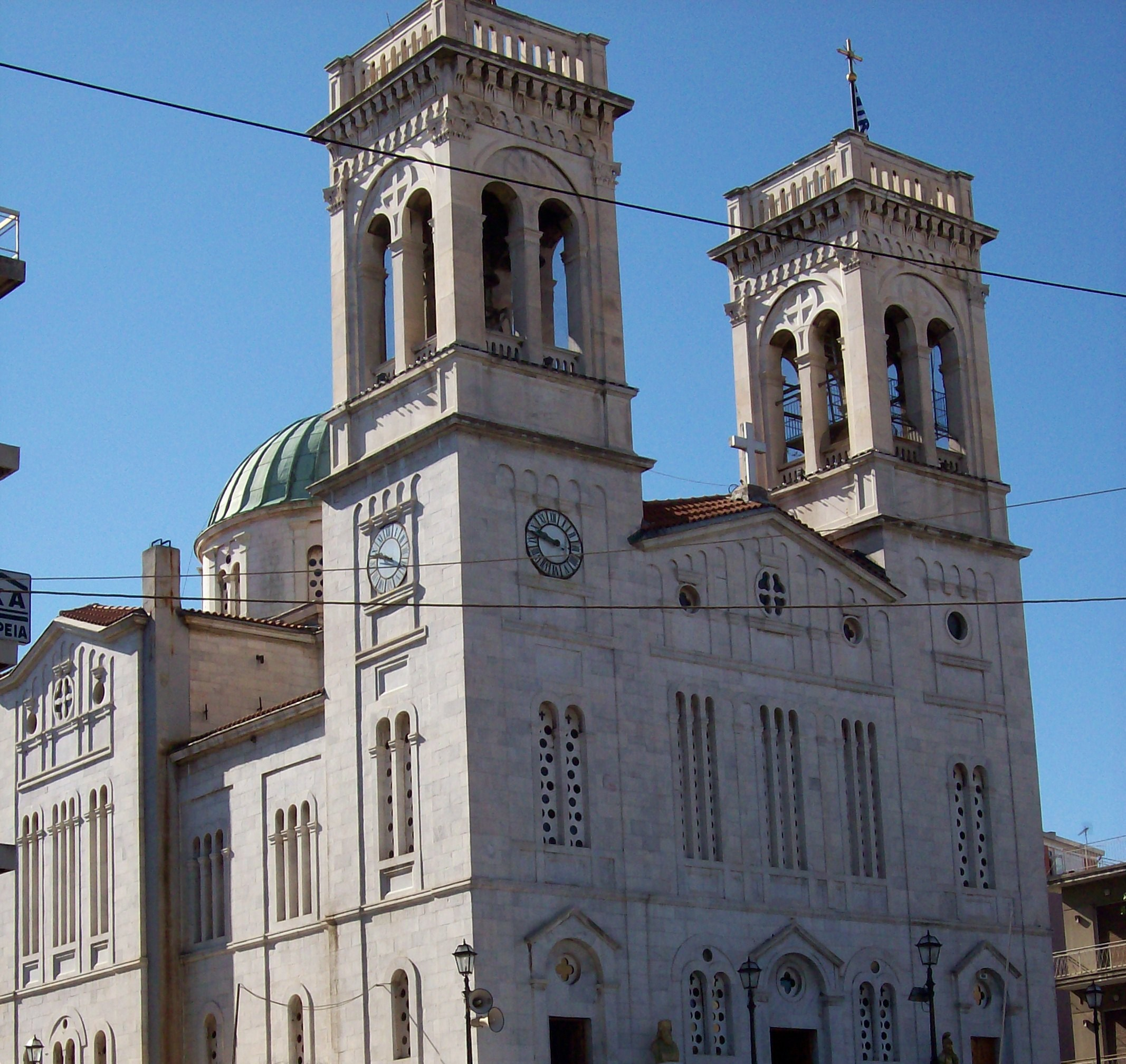
Agios Vasilios (St Basil), Tripoli's cathedral. Facade built with Doliana marble

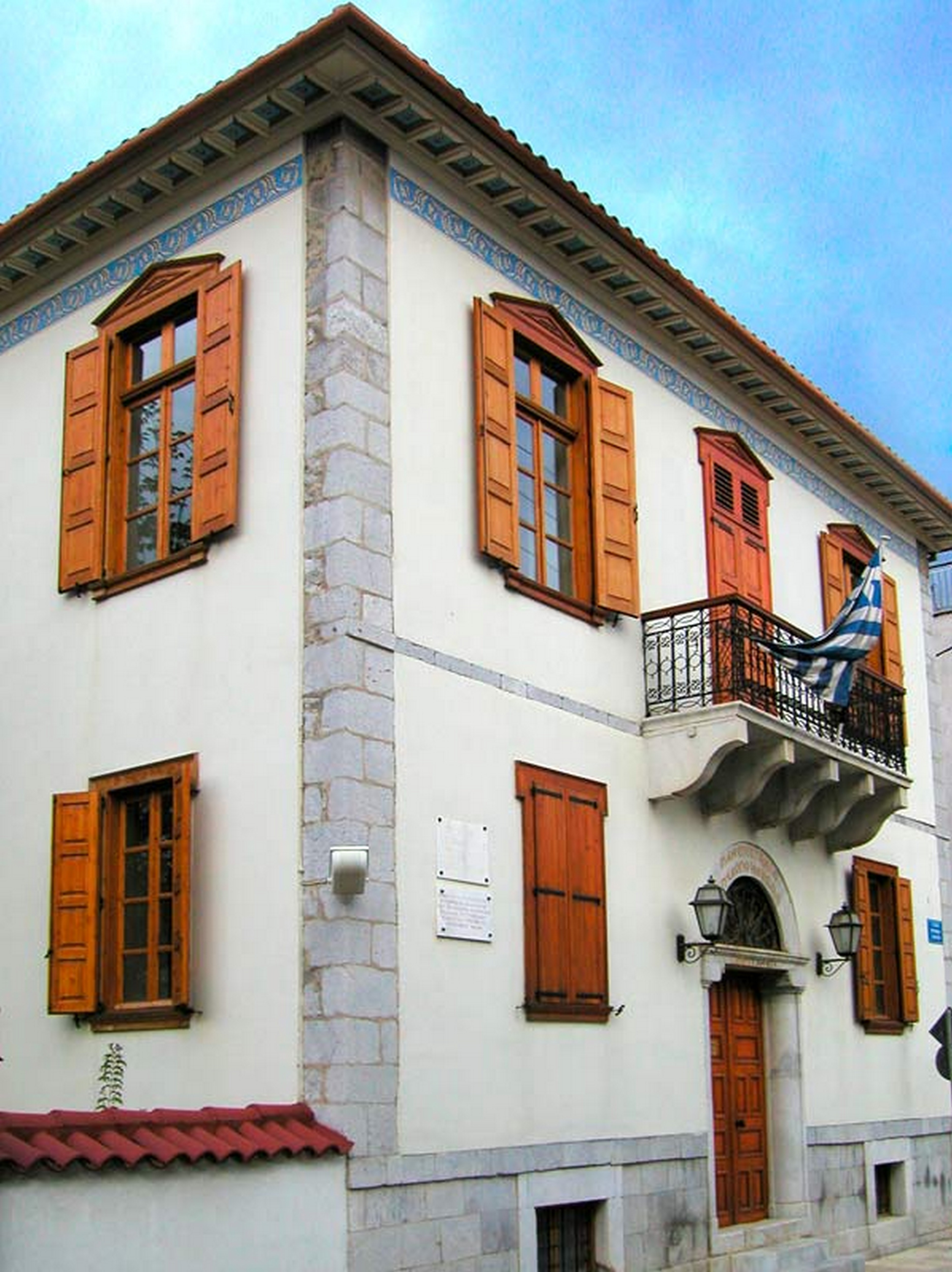
House of Kostas Karyotakis

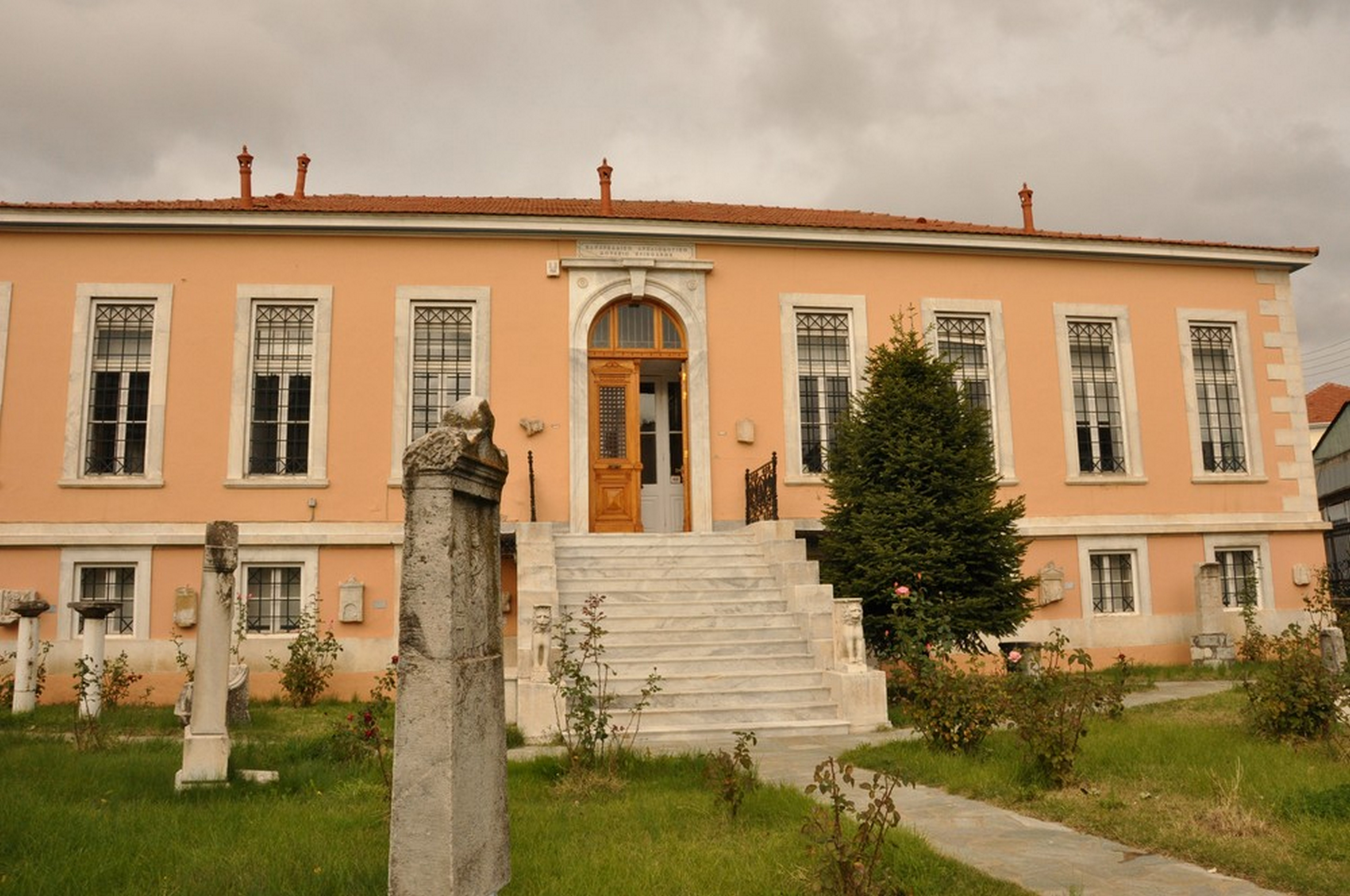
The archaeological museum

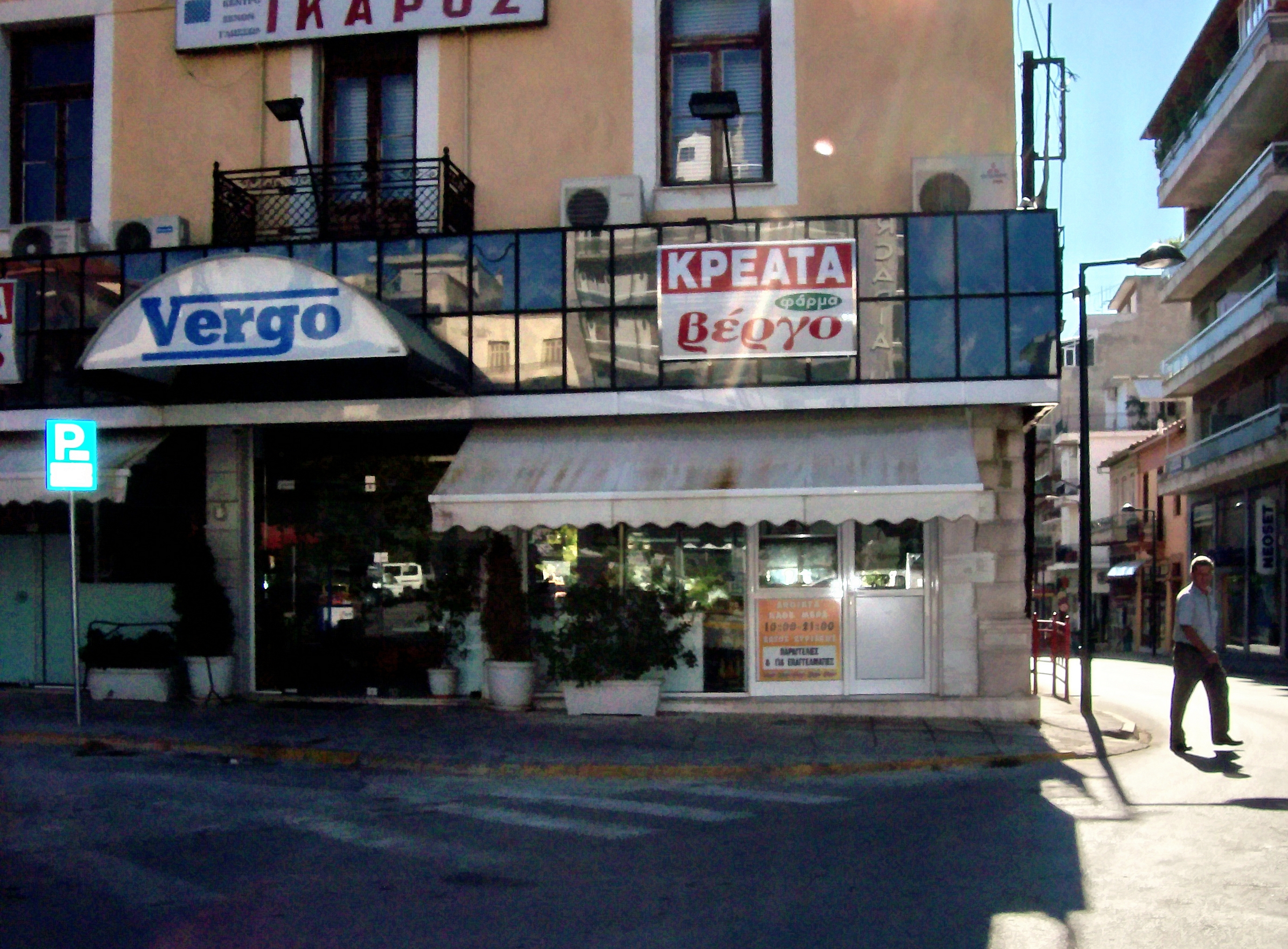
A street in Tripoli

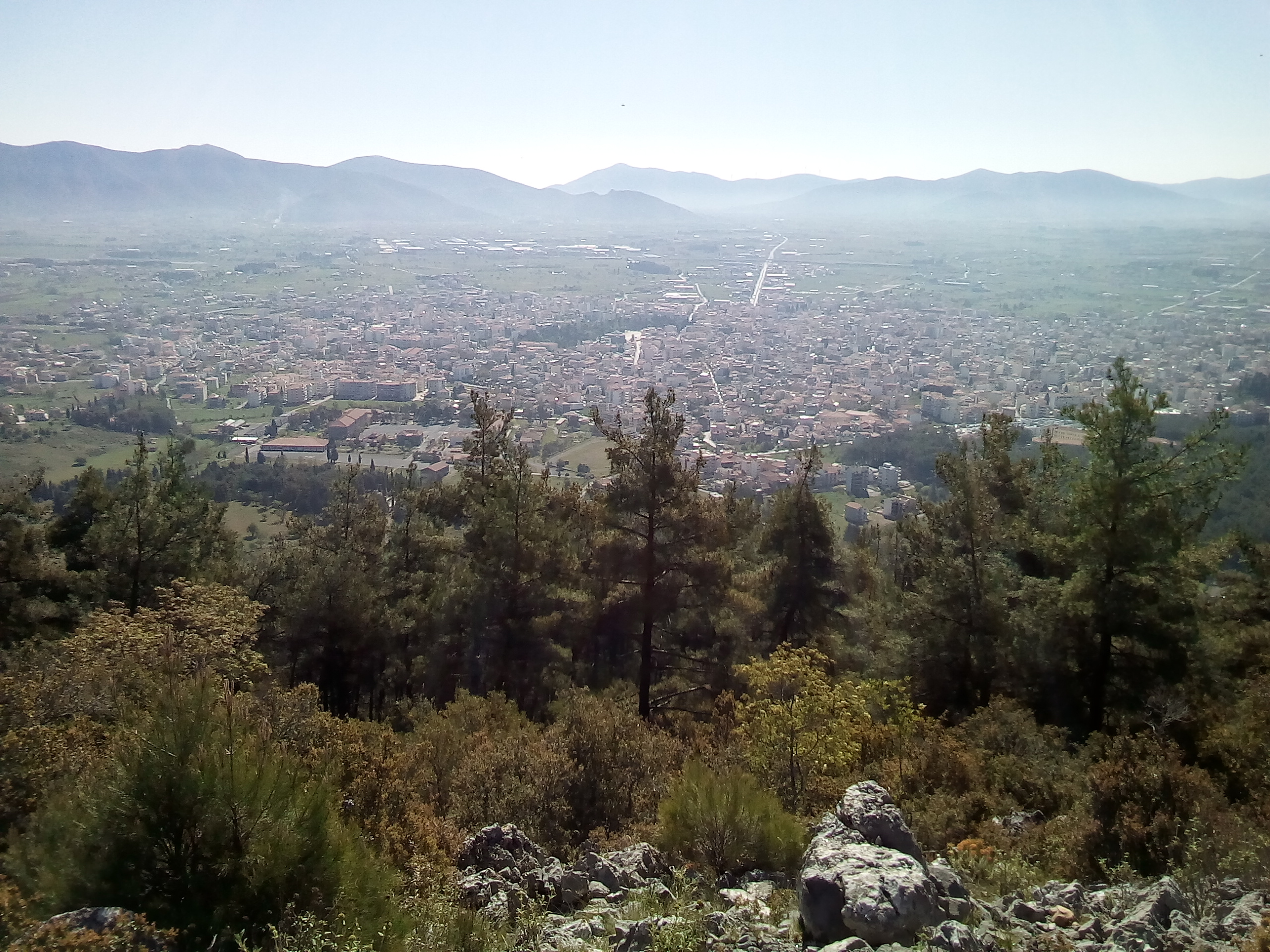
Panoramic view of Tripoli
