= Nonacris (disambiguation) =

Nonacris was an ancient Greek town in the region of Pheneus

Nonacris may also refer to:

- Nonacris (Orchomenus), an ancient Greek town in the region of Orchomenus
- Nonacris (mythology), the wife of king Lycaon of Arcadia in Greek mythology
- Nonacris (fly), a genus of flies in the family Stratiomyidae
