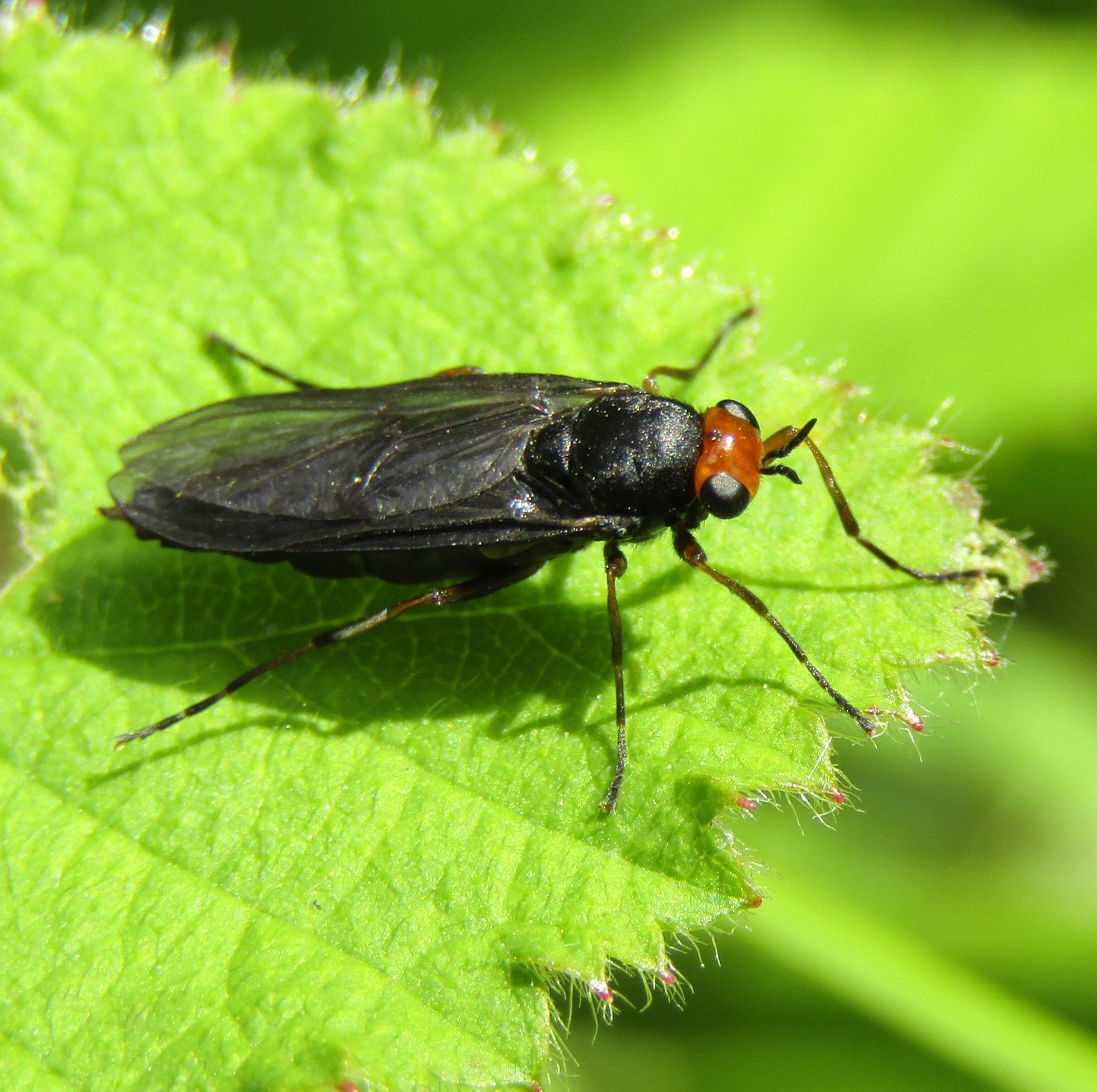

Scientific classification
- Kingdom: Animalia
- Phylum: Arthropoda
- Clade: Pancrustacea
- Class: Insecta
- Order: Diptera
- Family: Stratiomyidae
- Subfamily: Chiromyzinae
- Genus: Inopus
- Species: I. rubriceps

Binomial name
- Inopus rubriceps (Macquart, 1847)

Synonyms
- List: Metoponia rubriceps Macquart, 1847; Inopus despectus Walker, 1850; Chiromyza fulvicaput Walker, 1852; Inopus despectnus Hunter, 1900; Cryptoberis hebescens White, 1916; Chiromyza flavicaput Hardy, 1920; Chiromyza herbescens Hardy, 1920

= Inopus rubriceps =

Species of fly

Inopus rubriceps, known generally as the sugarcane soldier fly or Australian soldier fly, is a species of soldier fly in the family Stratiomyidae. The fly acts as a host for the parasitoid wasps Neurogalesus carinatus and Neurogalesus militis. The species causes damage to pasture, as well as oat and maize crops, however the degree of damage it causes means it is not considered a major pest.

Though native to South East Queensland and northern New South Wales areas in Australia, its introduced range includes California and New Zealand. Populations tend to prefer warm, moist climates in subtropical/tropical regions, and no related species occur in its native range, suggesting a long evolutionary history for the fly in the region. The species was first recorded in New Zealand in 1944, appearing at Ōpōtiki in the Bay of Plenty in the North Island.
