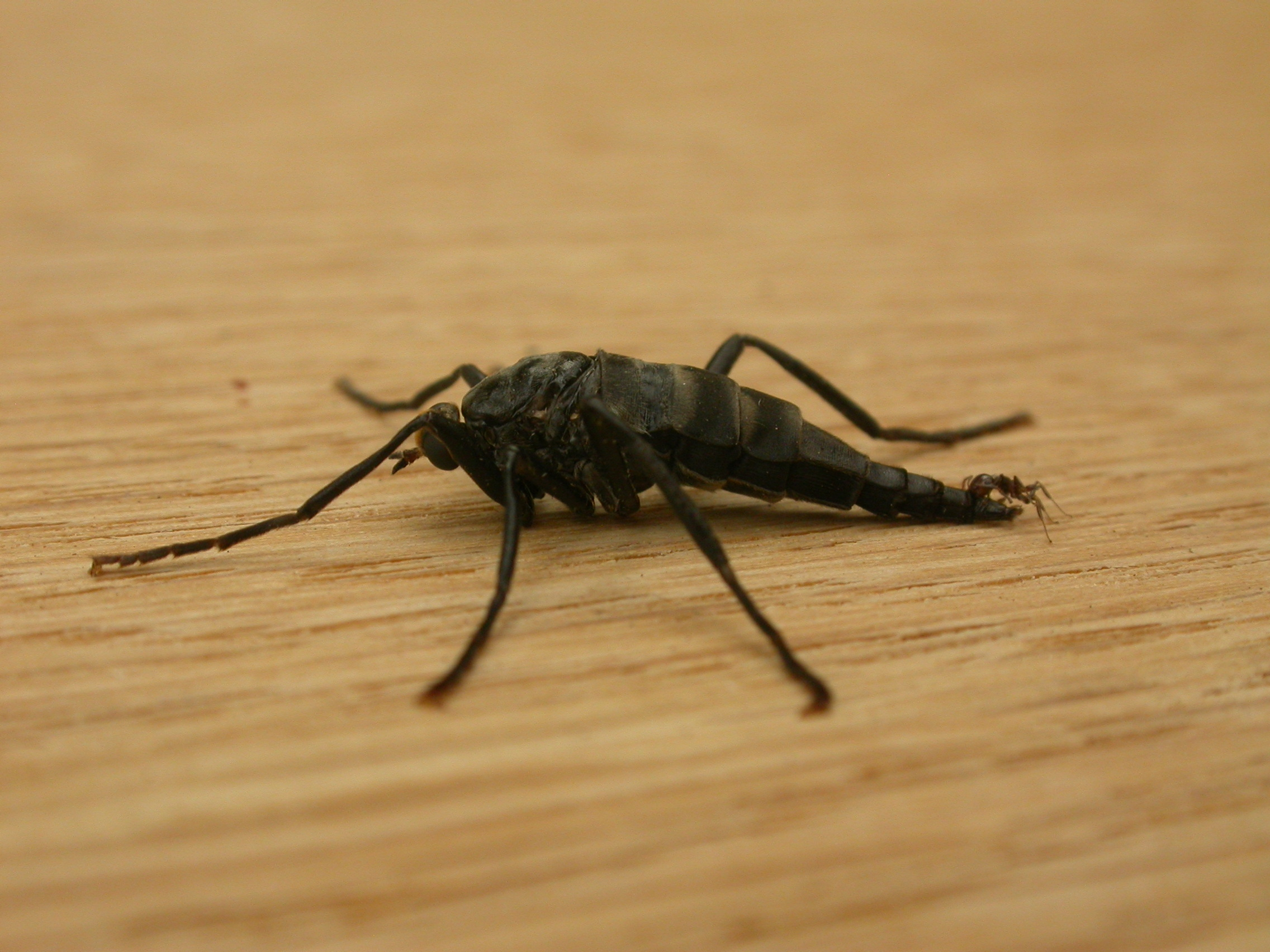
- Boreoides subulatus

Scientific classification
- Kingdom: Animalia
- Phylum: Arthropoda
- Clade: Pancrustacea
- Class: Insecta
- Order: Diptera
- Family: Stratiomyidae
- Subfamily: Chiromyzinae
- Genus: Boreoides; Hardy, 1920

Type species
- Boreoides subulatus Hardy, 1920

= Boreoides =

Genus of flies

Boreoides is a genus of flies in the family Stratiomyidae.

== Species ==
- Boreoides machiliformis (Enderlein, 1921)
- Boreoides subulatus Hardy, 1920
- Boreoides tasmaniensis Bezzi, 1922
