= Stenimantia =

Scientific classification
- Kingdom: Animalia
- Phylum: Arthropoda
- Class: Insecta
- Order: Diptera
- Family: Stratiomyidae
- Subfamily: Chiromyzinae
- Genus: Stenimantia; Enderlein, 1932

Type species
- Xylophagus carbonarius Philippi, 1865)

Genus of flies

Stenimantia is a genus of flies in the family Stratiomyidae.

== Species ==
- Stenimantia carbonaria (Philippi, 1865)
