= Nikos Floros =

Greek sculptor

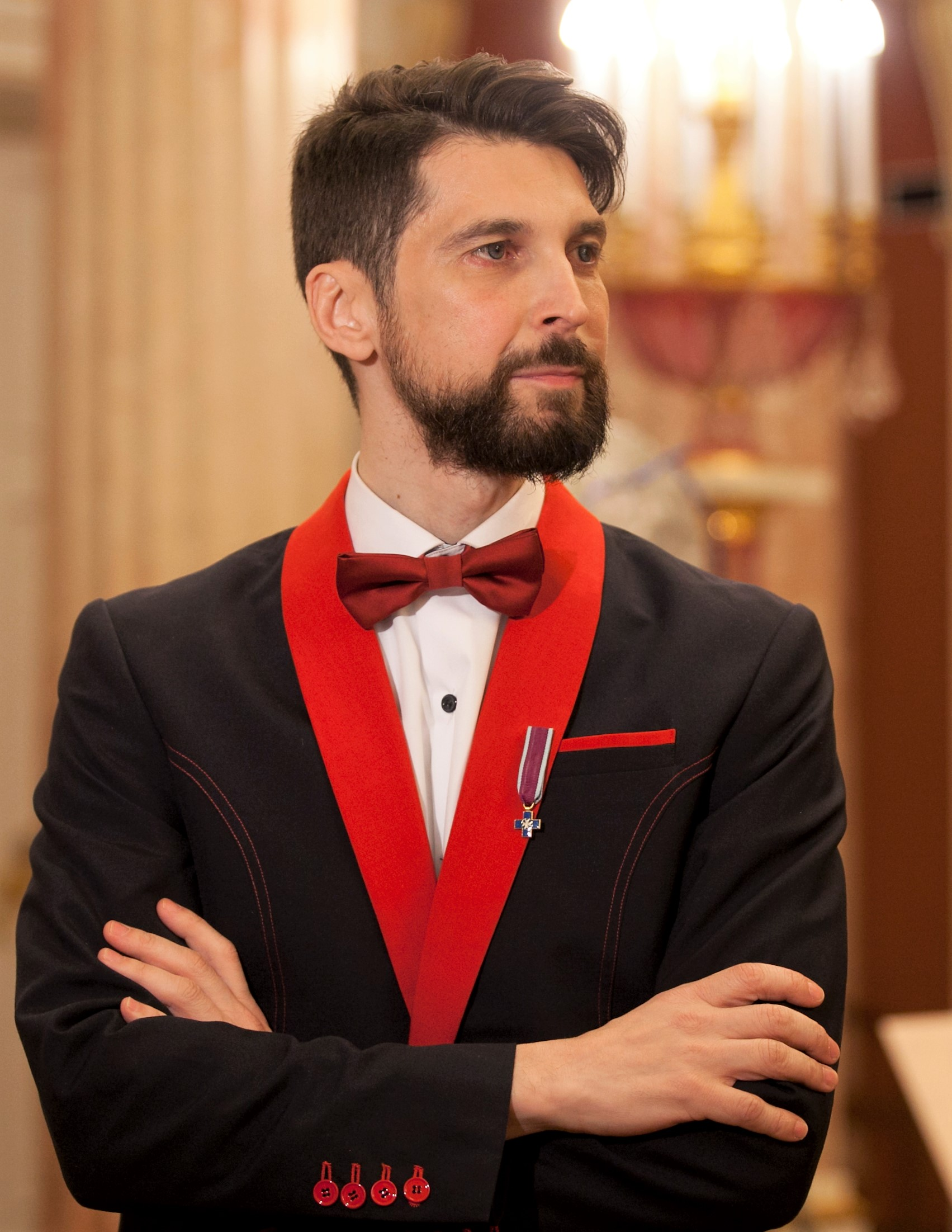
- Education: National School of Fine Arts, Paris, France - École des Beaux-Arts, Classical Piano, Drama, Design
- Occupation: Artist – Sculptor
- Website: https://www.nikosfloros.com/

Nikos Floros is a Greek sculptor. He is known for creating sculptural art by using aluminium cans for soft drinks as raw material. This technique was created and patented by Floros in New York in 2003.

Nikos Floros’ artwork was chosen by the Brazilian educational system to be included in school textbooks.

== Biography ==
Floros was born in Tripoli, Arcadia. He grew up in Athens, where he studied classical piano and ancient drama. He continued his studies at the National School of Fine Arts in Paris, France — École des Beaux-Arts.

== Exhibitions ==
Solo exhibitions:

- Foundation of the Hellenic World, Athens, Greece, 2008
- Archaeological Museum of Thessaloniki, Greece, 2011
- Grace: Symbol of Change, Monte Carlo, 2012
- Metropole Palace, Monte Carlo, 2012
- National Museum of Women in the Arts, Washington, D.C., USA, 2012
- Melas Mansion, National Bank of Greece, Athens, Greece, 2013
- Teatro Comunale di Bologna, Bologna, Italy, 2013
- Tsaritsyno Museum-Reserve, Moscow, Russia, 2013
- Grand Hotel Majestic "già Baglioni", Bologna, Italy, 2013
- The Knights' Grand Master Palace, Rhodes Island, Greece, 2015
- Heroes Made of Metal, Collection “Victoria G. Karelia”, Kalamata, Greece, 2021
- Syntagma Square of the Attiko Metro, Athens, Greece
- Gallery Art Cargo, Hellenic-German Exhibition, Athens, Greece
- Greek Consulate in New York; The Hofburg Imperial Palace, Vienna, Austria

Group Exhibitions:

- Whitney Museum of American Art
- Metropolitan Club
- French Heritage Society
- Benaki Museum, Athens, Greece
- The Hofburg Imperial Palace, Vienna, Austria
- Historical and Folklore Museum of Aegina, Greece
- Piraeus Bank, Athens, Greece
- Pierides Museum “Athinais”, Athens, Greece
- Art Meets Media, Athens, Greece
- The Hofburg Imperial Palace, Vienna, Austria
- Consulate General of the Republic of Cyprus, New York, NY, USA

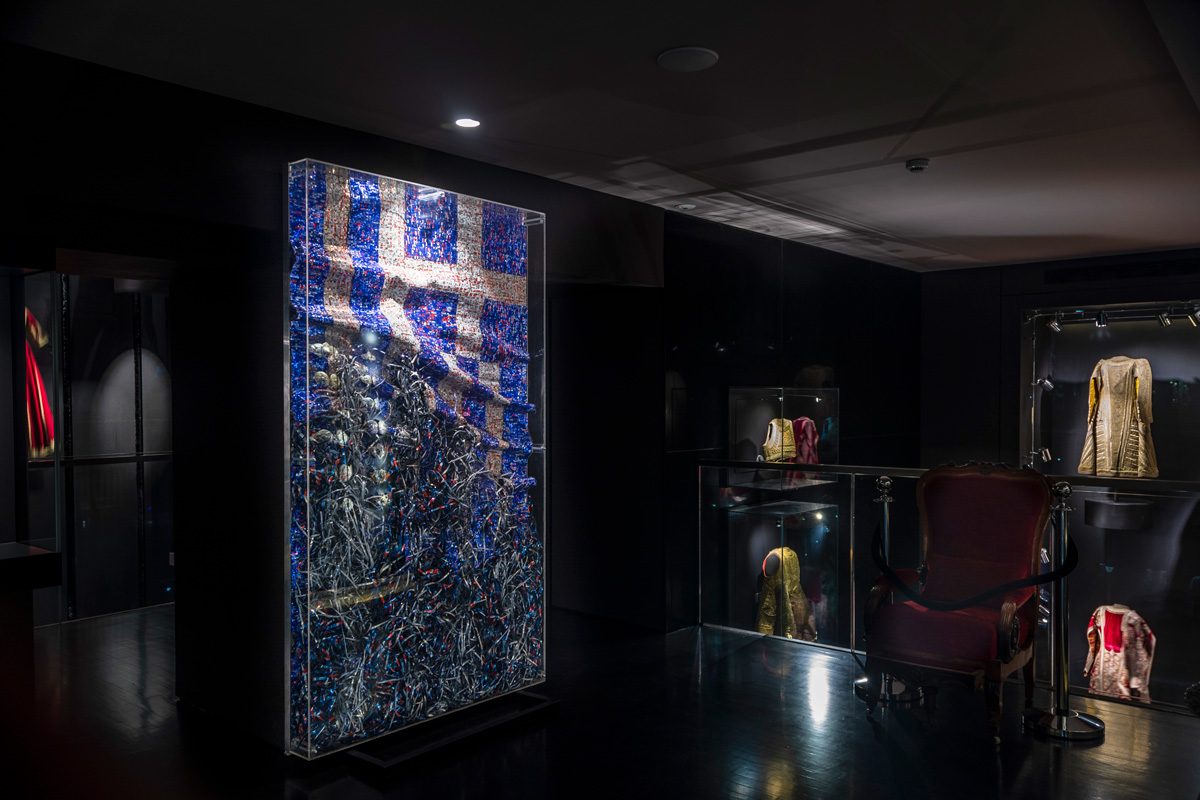
Artwork “Greek Flag”, made of aluminium with Nikos Floros’ technique. Photo by Robert Zervos.

== Awards ==
- Grand Prize, for the “Red Queen Elizabeth” artwork-costume, given by the Metropolitan Museum of Art Costume Institute
- Grand Prize, for the “Silver Elizabeth I” artwork-costume, from the “Young Friends Heritage Society”
- Golden medal of Arts and Sciences, Albert Schweitzer Foundation, 2011
- Global Thinkers Forum Excellence Award for Excellence and Innovation, 2013
