= Mesomyza =

Scientific classification
- Kingdom: Animalia
- Phylum: Arthropoda
- Clade: Pancrustacea
- Class: Insecta
- Order: Diptera
- Family: Stratiomyidae
- Subfamily: Chiromyzinae
- Genus: Mesomyza; Enderlein, 1921

Type species
- Mesomyza interrupta Enderlein, 1921

Genus of flies

Mesomyza is a genus of flies in the family Stratiomyidae.

== Species ==
- Mesomyza interrupta Enderlein, 1921
- Mesomyza sericea Enderlein, 1921
- Mesomyza tenuicornis Enderlein, 1921
