= Nonacris (Orchomenus) =

Nonacris or Nonakris (Ancient Greek: Νώνακρις) was a town of northern ancient Arcadia, named for the Arcadian king Lycaon's wife, in the territory of Orchomenus. With Dipoena and Calliae, it formed the Arcadian Tripolis.

It was near the Arcadian Styx river, which the Arcadians swore oaths by.
