= Lake Taka =

Lake in Greece

Coordinates: 37.433°N 22.370°E

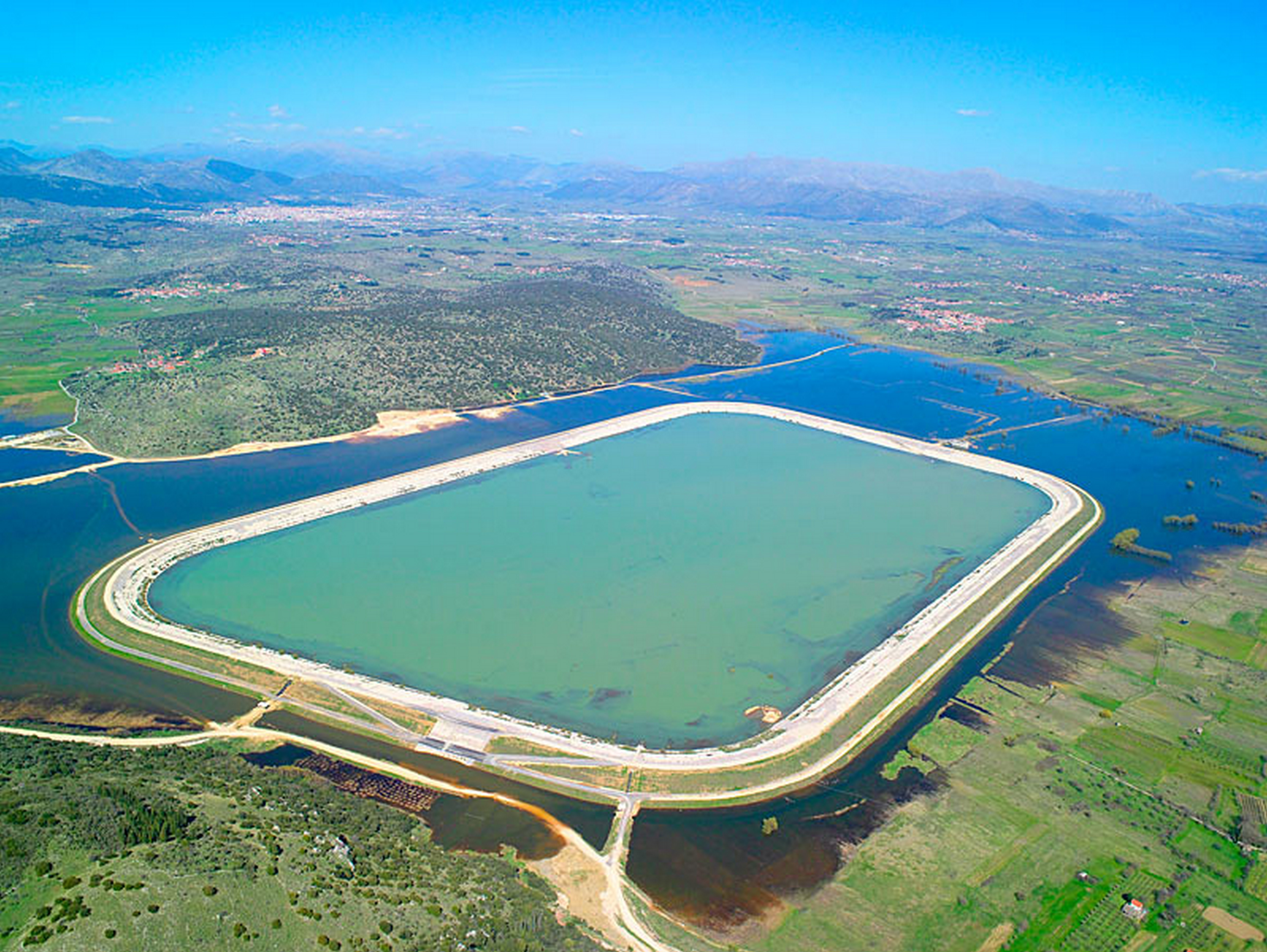
Pond, floods around, ponors, former temporary Lake Taka

Lake Taka (Greek: Λίμνη Τάκα, romanized: Limni Taka) is a temporary lake in Arcadia, Greece, located in the south of a large basin known as the Plateau of Tripoli. In the winter, the southern part of the basin often gets flooded, and a lake forms from a large amount of fresh rainwater because of insufficient surface drainage. A wetland biotope quickly develops, and species of water-loving fauna appear. In the hot and dry summer, the lake dries up. Over time, karstification creates several ponors, where water leaves the basin through groundwater.

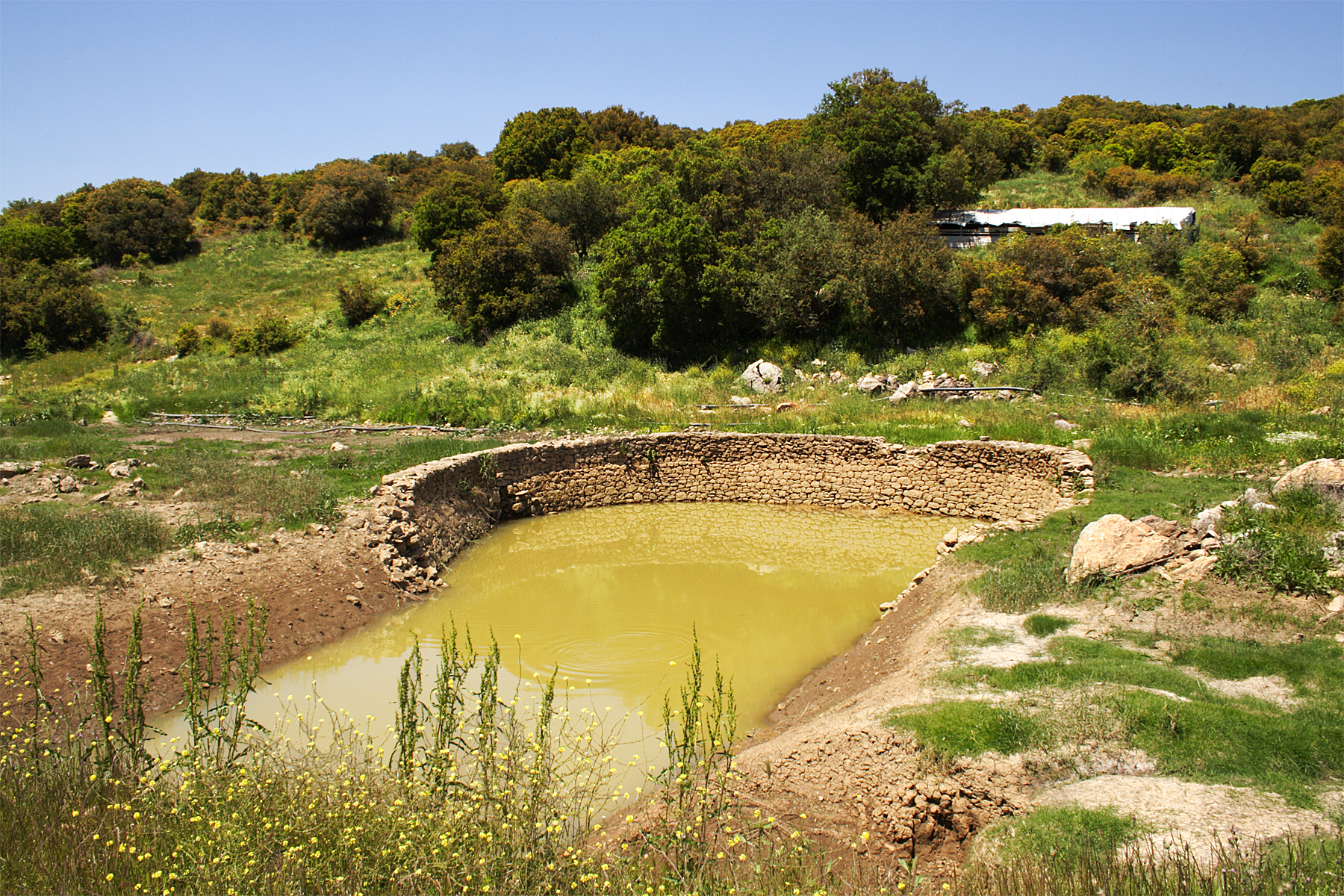
One of 7 ponors draining Lake Taka

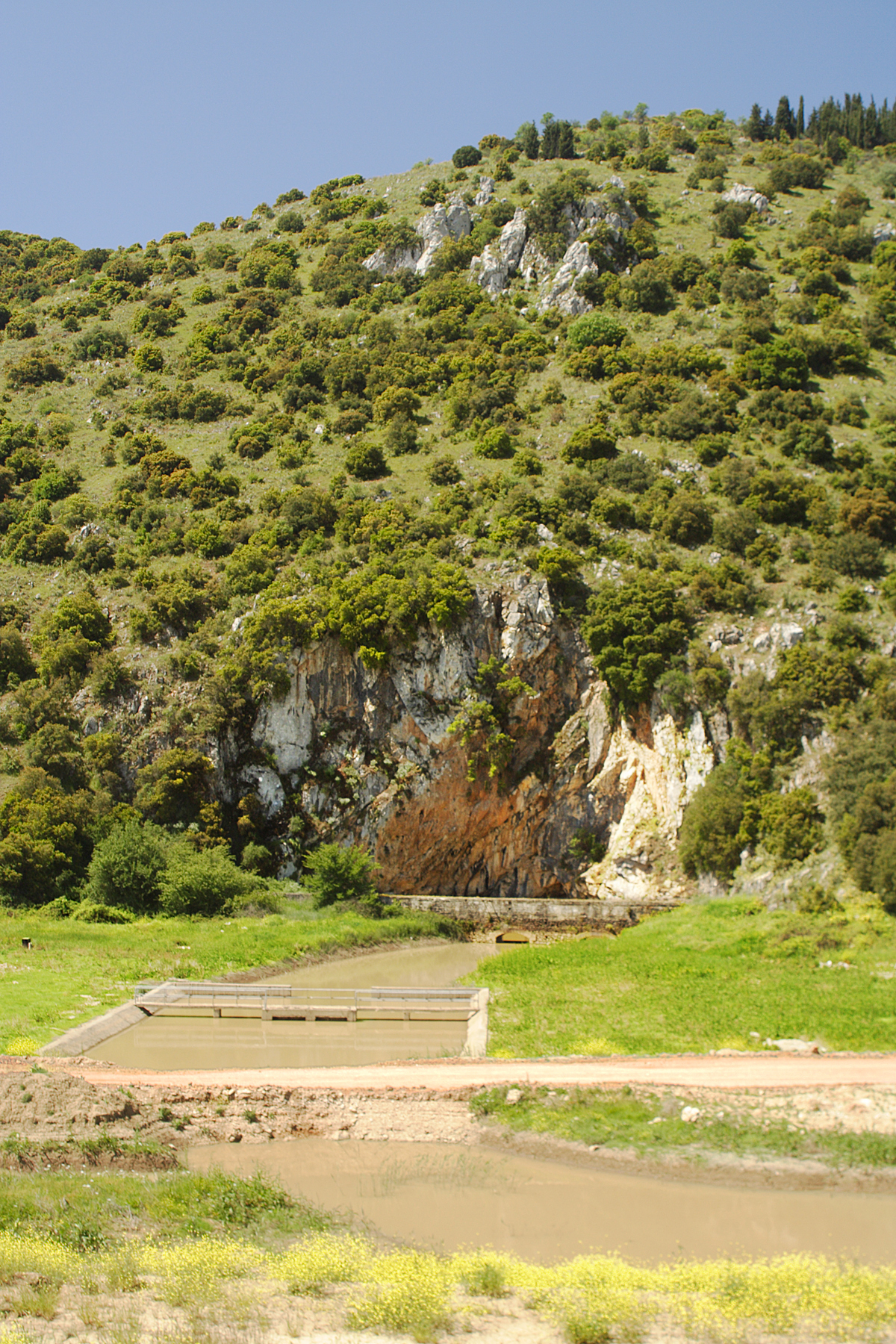
Largest ponor (Καταβόθρα katavothra) of old Lake Taka

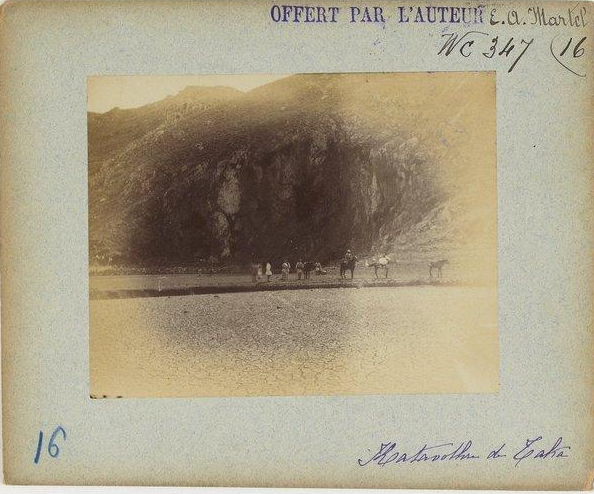
Historical image of largest katavothra of old Lake Taka

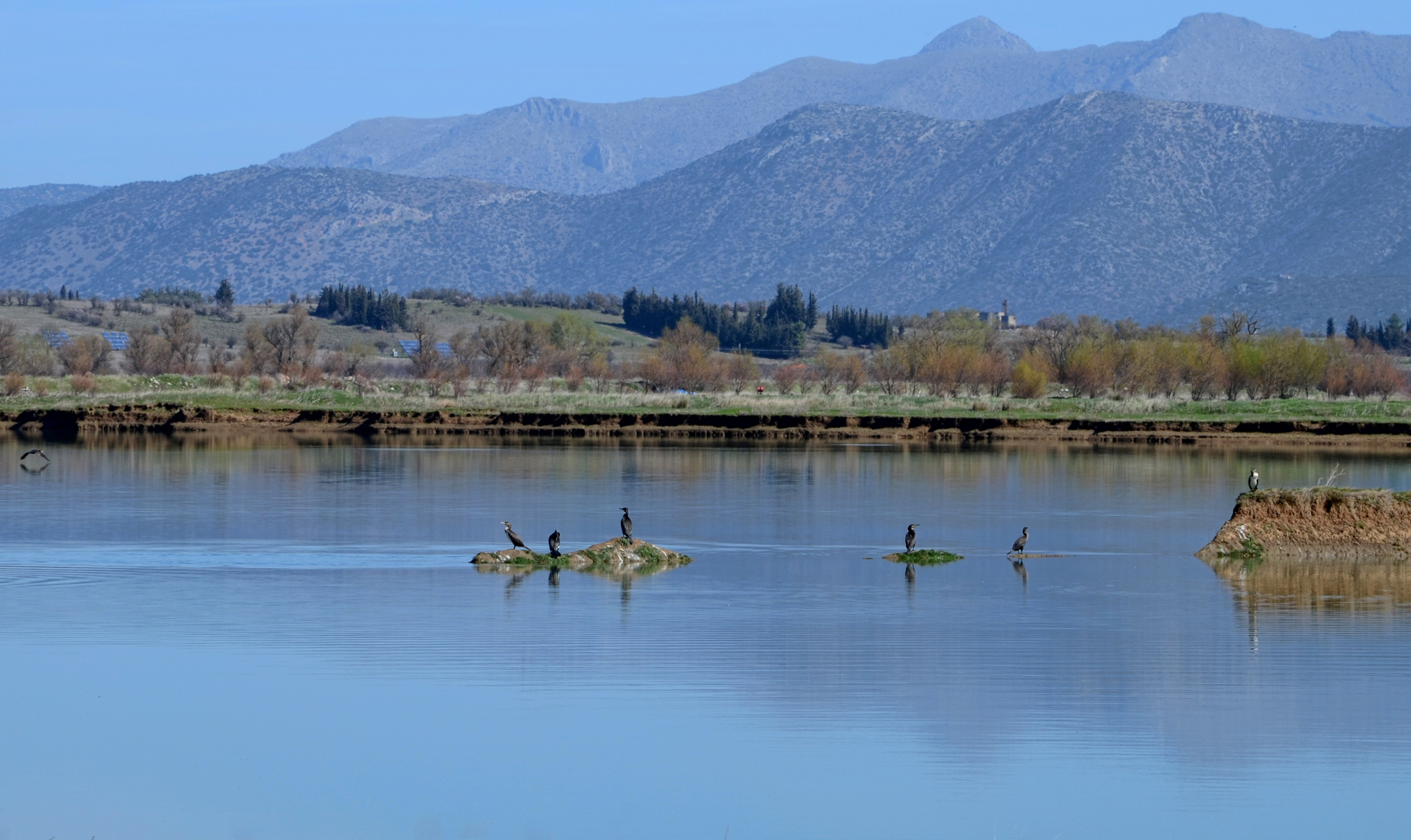
Lake Taka

== Geography ==
Lake Taka sits at an altitude of 650 meters east of Tegea and ca. 10 km south of Tripoli, the capital of Arcadia. The lake collects rainwater, which comes from the mountains around the basin, called “Tripoli-Plateau” (length ca. 30 km and width between 12.5 and 25 km). In the hot and dry summer season, the temporary lake usually dries totally up (leaving some irrigation water in the dammed pond).

The land of the Tripoli Basin gradually became regulated (mainly after 1945) and most of it turned into farmland. The large pond was built around 2000 with the support of an EU-fund, to retain water for irrigation in the dry season.

== Geology and geo-hydrology ==
The basin is surrounded by mountains. The basin has no significant erosion. The topography is drained by surface waterways. Such “closed basins” and their occurrence on the Peloponnese and also in Arcadia are a rare geological phenomenon. In almost the whole Peloponnese region, intense tectonics shattered the limestone- and similar carbonate formations of Arcadia over time. Water runs through the tectonically induced fractures and chemically dissolves the rock (karstifikation) and thus widens the fractures over time. At the bottom of slopes, where the water of the lake is in direct contact with carbonate rock these fractures slowly enlarge to become ponors (katavothres, Greek: καταβόθρες), that drain the water. Seven ponors of different sizes (one large ponor deeply carved a steep rock wall by ca. 25 m), to drain the lake. Even when these katavothres are not clogged, drainage is slow. This is why farming cannot start in due time. In rainy winters, as 2003, access water floods the ground around the dam, as this is the lowest section of the Tripoli-Plateau.

== Environment and nature ==
When floods outside the dammed pond occur, the rain favors a quick development of a wetland biotope. Fauna include seabirds and kingfishers. Exploratory excavations at the lake found traces of the ancient city of Manthirea, which derives from the old name of the area "Manthuriko Plain". The formerly larger wetland site was protected as a Natura 2000 habitat.

== See also ==
- Polje
- Argon Pedion

== Sources ==
- Jacobshagen, Volker. (1986). Geologie von Griechenland. Gebr. Borntraeger. ISBN 3-443-11019-3. OCLC 16278883.
- Morfis, A. Zojer, Hans. (1986). Karst hydrogeology of the central and eastern Peloponnesus (Greece). Springer-Verlag. OCLC 636807333.
- Ford, Derek; Williams, Paul (2013-07-02), "Karst Hydrogeology", Karst Hydrogeology and Geomorphology, John Wiley & Sons Ltd,., pp. 103–144, doi:10.1002/9781118684986.ch5, ISBN 978-1-118-68498-6
- Mariolakos, Ilias. Geomythological Sites and Prehistoric geotechnical and hydraulic Works in Arkadia, 12th International Congress of the Geological Society of Greece, Field Trip Guide, Patras May 2010 in Greek
