= Hylorops =

Scientific classification
- Kingdom: Animalia
- Phylum: Arthropoda
- Clade: Pancrustacea
- Class: Insecta
- Order: Diptera
- Family: Stratiomyidae
- Subfamily: Chiromyzinae
- Genus: Hylorops; Enderlein, 1921

Type species
- Hylorops philippii Enderlein, 1921

Genus of flies

Hylorops is a genus of flies in the family Stratiomyidae.

== Species ==
- Hylorops philippii Enderlein, 1921
