= Calliae =

Calliae or Kalliai (Ancient Greek: Καλλίαι), also known as Callia or Kallia (Καλλία), was a village of ancient Arcadia, located near Tegea. With Dipoena and Nonacris, it formed the Arcadian Tripolis. Its population was translated to the newly formed city of Megalopolis upon the foundation of the latter city in 371 BCE. Its site is unlocated.
