= Barbiellinia =

Scientific classification
- Kingdom: Animalia
- Phylum: Arthropoda
- Clade: Pancrustacea
- Class: Insecta
- Order: Diptera
- Family: Stratiomyidae
- Subfamily: Chiromyzinae
- Genus: Barbiellinia; Bezzi, 1922

Type species
- Barbiellinia hirta Bezzi, 1922

Genus of flies

Barbiellinia is a genus of flies in the family Stratiomyidae.

== Species ==
- Barbiellinia annulipes (Enderlein, 1921)
- Barbiellinia hirta Bezzi, 1922
- Barbiellinia lineata (Enderlein, 1921)
- Barbiellinia murcicornis (Enderlein, 1921)
- Barbiellinia parvicornis (Enderlein, 1921)
