= Tana (fly) =

Scientific classification
- Kingdom: Animalia
- Phylum: Arthropoda
- Class: Insecta
- Order: Diptera
- Family: Stratiomyidae
- Subfamily: Chiromyzinae
- Genus: Tana; Reed, 1888

Type species
- Lagarus paulseni Philippi, 1865)

Synonyms
- Lagarus Philippi, 1865

Genus of flies

Tana is a genus of flies in the family Stratiomyidae.

== Species ==
- Tana paradoxa (Enderlein, 1913)
- Tana paulseni (Philippi, 1865)
