= Clavimyia =

Scientific classification
- Kingdom: Animalia
- Phylum: Arthropoda
- Class: Insecta
- Order: Diptera
- Family: Stratiomyidae
- Subfamily: Chiromyzinae
- Genus: Clavimyia; Lindner, 1924

Type species
- Clavimyia alticola Lindner, 1924

Genus of flies

Clavimyia is a genus of flies in the family Stratiomyidae.

== Species ==
- Clavimyia alticola Lindner, 1924
