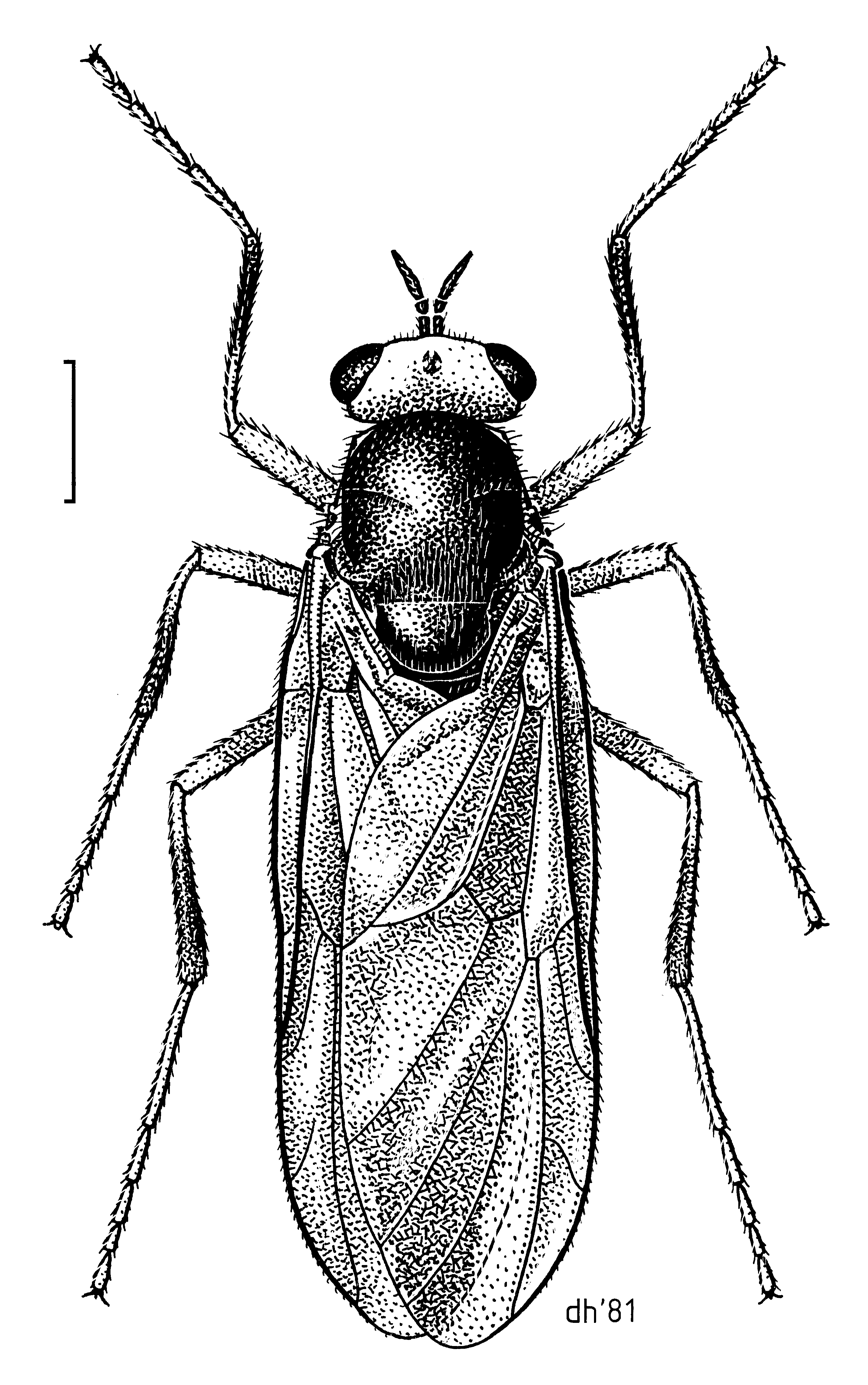
- Inopus rubriceps

Scientific classification
- Kingdom: Animalia
- Phylum: Arthropoda
- Clade: Pancrustacea
- Class: Insecta
- Order: Diptera
- Family: Stratiomyidae
- Subfamily: Chiromyzinae
- Genus: Inopus; Walker, 1850

Synonyms
- Altermetoponia Miller, 1945; Cryptoberis White, 1916

= Inopus =

Genus of flies

Inopus is a genus of soldier flies in the family Stratiomyidae.

== Species ==
- Inopus brevicornis Nagatomi & Yukawa, 1968
- Inopus flavus (James, 1968)
- Inopus geminus (Hardy, 1920)
- Inopus grossus Nagatomi & Yukawa, 1968
- Inopus hitchcocki (James, 1961)
- Inopus rubriceps (Macquart, 1847) (sugarcane soldier fly)
