= Chiromyza =

Scientific classification
- Kingdom: Animalia
- Phylum: Arthropoda
- Class: Insecta
- Order: Diptera
- Family: Stratiomyidae
- Subfamily: Chiromyzinae
- Genus: Chiromyza; Wiedemann, 1820

Type species
- Chiromyza vittata Wiedemann, 1820

Genus of flies

Chiromyza is a genus of flies in the family Stratiomyidae.

== Species ==
- Chiromyza australis (Macquart, 1850)
- Chiromyza ava (Enderlein, 1921)
- Chiromyza brevicornis (Lindner, 1949)
- Chiromyza enderleini (Lindner, 1949)
- Chiromyza fulva Nagatomi & Yukawa, 1969
- Chiromyza gressitti Nagatomi & Yukawa, 1969
- Chiromyza leptiformis (Macquart, 1838)
- Chiromyza matruelis (Enderlein, 1921)
- Chiromyza nigra Bezzi, 1922
- Chiromyza ochracea Wiedemann, 1820
- Chiromyza papuae Nagatomi & Yukawa, 1969
- Chiromyza prisca Walker, 1852
- Chiromyza raccai Pujol-Luz, 2020
- Chiromyza sedlaceki Nagatomi & Yukawa, 1969
- Chiromyza stemmaticalis (Enderlein, 1921)
- Chiromyza stylicornis (Enderlein, 1921)
- Chiromyza tenuicornis (Lindner, 1949)
- Chiromyza tristrigata (Enderlein, 1921)
- Chiromyza vicina Bigot, 1879
- Chiromyza vittata Wiedemann, 1820
