= Mapuchemyia =

Scientific classification
- Kingdom: Animalia
- Phylum: Arthropoda
- Class: Insecta
- Order: Diptera
- Family: Stratiomyidae
- Subfamily: Chiromyzinae
- Genus: Mapuchemyia; Woodley, 2001

Type species
- Mapuchemyia krausei Philippi, 1865

Synonyms
- Hylorus Philippi, 1865

Genus of flies

Mapuchemyia is a genus of flies in the family Stratiomyidae.

== Species ==
- Mapuchemyia australis (Aubertin, 1930)
- Mapuchemyia krausei (Philippi, 1865)
