= Archilagarinus =

Scientific classification
- Kingdom: Animalia
- Phylum: Arthropoda
- Clade: Pancrustacea
- Class: Insecta
- Order: Diptera
- Family: Stratiomyidae
- Subfamily: Chiromyzinae
- Genus: Archilagarinus; Enderlein, 1932

Type species
- Archilagarinus priscus Enderlein, 1932

Genus of flies

Archilagarinus is a genus of flies in the family Stratiomyidae.

== Species ==
- Archilagarinus priscus Enderlein, 1932
