= Nonacris (fly) =

Scientific classification
- Kingdom: Animalia
- Phylum: Arthropoda
- Class: Insecta
- Order: Diptera
- Family: Stratiomyidae
- Subfamily: Chiromyzinae
- Genus: Nonacris; Walker, 1850

Type species
- Nonacris transequa Walker, 1856

Synonyms
- Nanacris Nagatomi, 1991

Genus of flies

Nonacris is a genus of flies in the family Stratiomyidae.

== Species ==
- Nonacris brevicornis Enderlein, 1921
- Nonacris chilensis Lindner, 1943
- Nonacris hamata James, 1975
- Nonacris laminata James, 1975
- Nonacris longicornis Enderlein, 1921
- Nonacris nigriventris Enderlein, 1921
- Nonacris partitifrons Enderlein, 1921
- Nonacris scutellaris Enderlein, 1921
- Nonacris transequa Walker, 1856
