= Dipoena (Arcadia) =

Dipoena or Dipoina (Ancient Greek: Δίποινα), also known as Dipoenae or Dipoinai (Δίποιναι), was a town in the north of ancient Arcadia. With Calliae and Nonacris, it formed the Arcadian Tripolis. Its population was translated to the newly formed city of Megalopolis upon the foundation of the latter city in 371 BCE. Its site is unlocated.
