= Mouchli =

Abandoned medieval town in Greece

Coordinates: 37°31′57″N 22°31′09″E

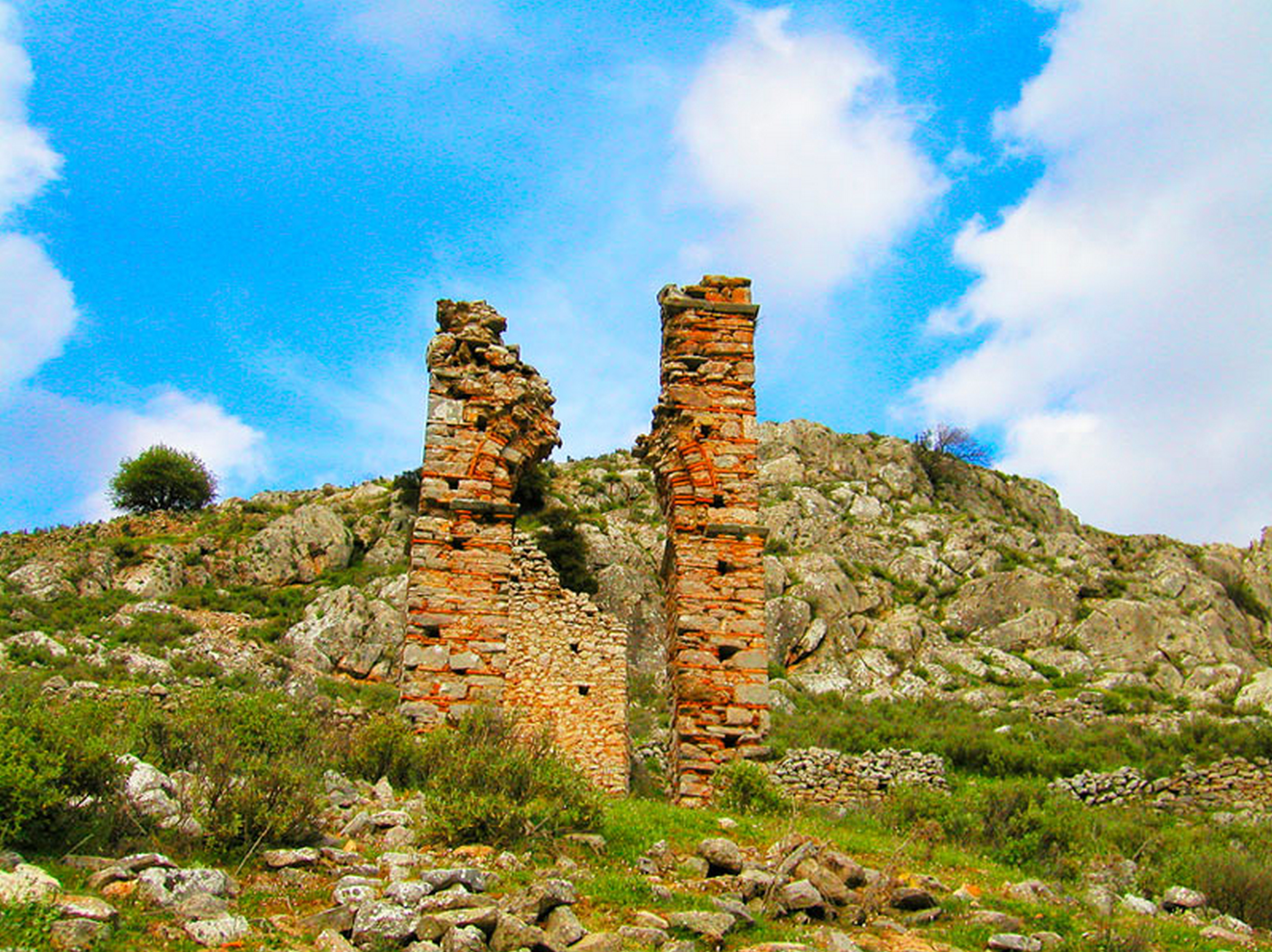
Ruins of Mouchli castle

Mouchli (Greek: Μουχλί) was a Byzantine town and castle in the Tegean plain in the Peloponnese in Greece. It was on the edge of the Partheni Basin, between the Tegean plain and the Argolid. In the early 14th century, after the fall of Nikli the seat of the Bishopric of Morea was moved from Nikli to Mouchli. Mouchli fell to the forces of Mehmed II in the 1460s, following the fall of the last Byzantine defences in this part of the Peloponnese. After the conquest, Mouchli lost much of its significance, and was abandoned.

== Bibliography ==
- Bakke, J. (2008) Forty Rivers: Landscape and Memory in the District of Ancient Tegea, Bergen: University of Bergen.
- Darko, E. (1933) Η ιστορική σημασία και τα σπουδαιότερα ερείπια του Μουχλίου.
- Panagiotopoulos, B. (1987) Πληθυσμός και οικισμοί της Πελοποννήσου. 13ος-18ος αιώνας, Athens: Εμπορική Τράπεζα της Ελλάδος, Ιστορικό Αρχείο.
