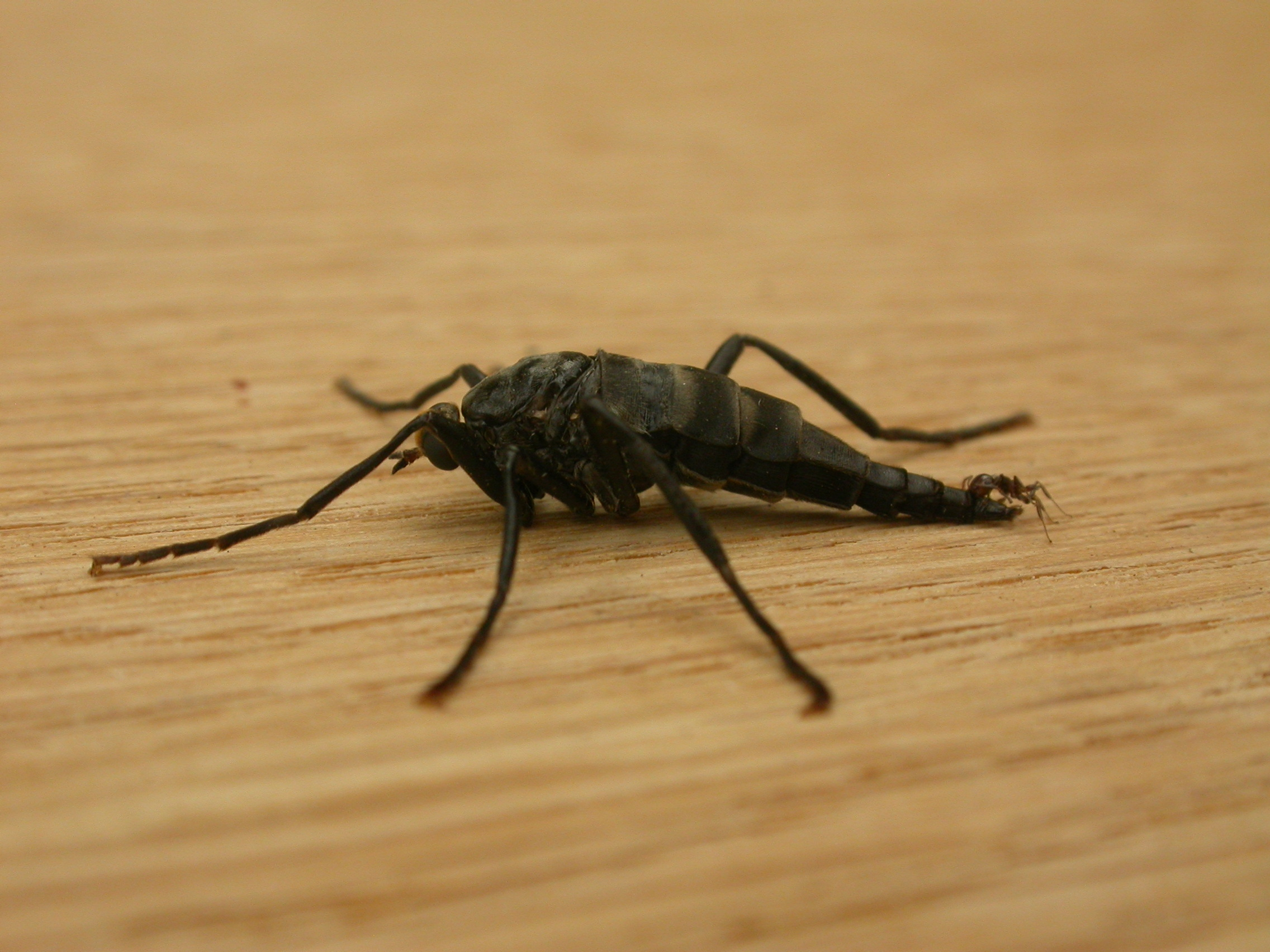
- Boreoides subulatus

Scientific classification
- Kingdom: Animalia
- Phylum: Arthropoda
- Clade: Pancrustacea
- Class: Insecta
- Order: Diptera
- Family: Stratiomyidae
- Subfamily: Chiromyzinae; Brauer, 1880

= Chiromyzinae =

Subfamily of flies

Chiromyzinae is a subfamily of soldier flies in the family Stratiomyidae.

== Genera ==
- Archilagarinus Enderlein, 1932
- Barbiellinia Bezzi, 1922
- Boreoides Hardy, 1920
- Chiromyza Wiedemann, 1820
- Clavimyia Lindner, 1924
- Hylorops Enderlein, 1921
- Inopus Walker, 1850
- Mapuchemyia Woodley, 2001
- Mesomyza Enderlein, 1921
- Nonacris Walker, 1850
- Stenimantia Enderlein, 1932
- Tana Reed, 1888
