= Tripolis (region of Arcadia) =

Tripolis (Greek: Τρίπολις; meaning "three cities") was a district in ancient Arcadia, Greece consisting of the three cities of Calliae (Calliæ), Dipoena (Dipœna), and Nonacris.
