= Atheros =

Developer of semiconductors for network communications

Atheros Communications, Inc.

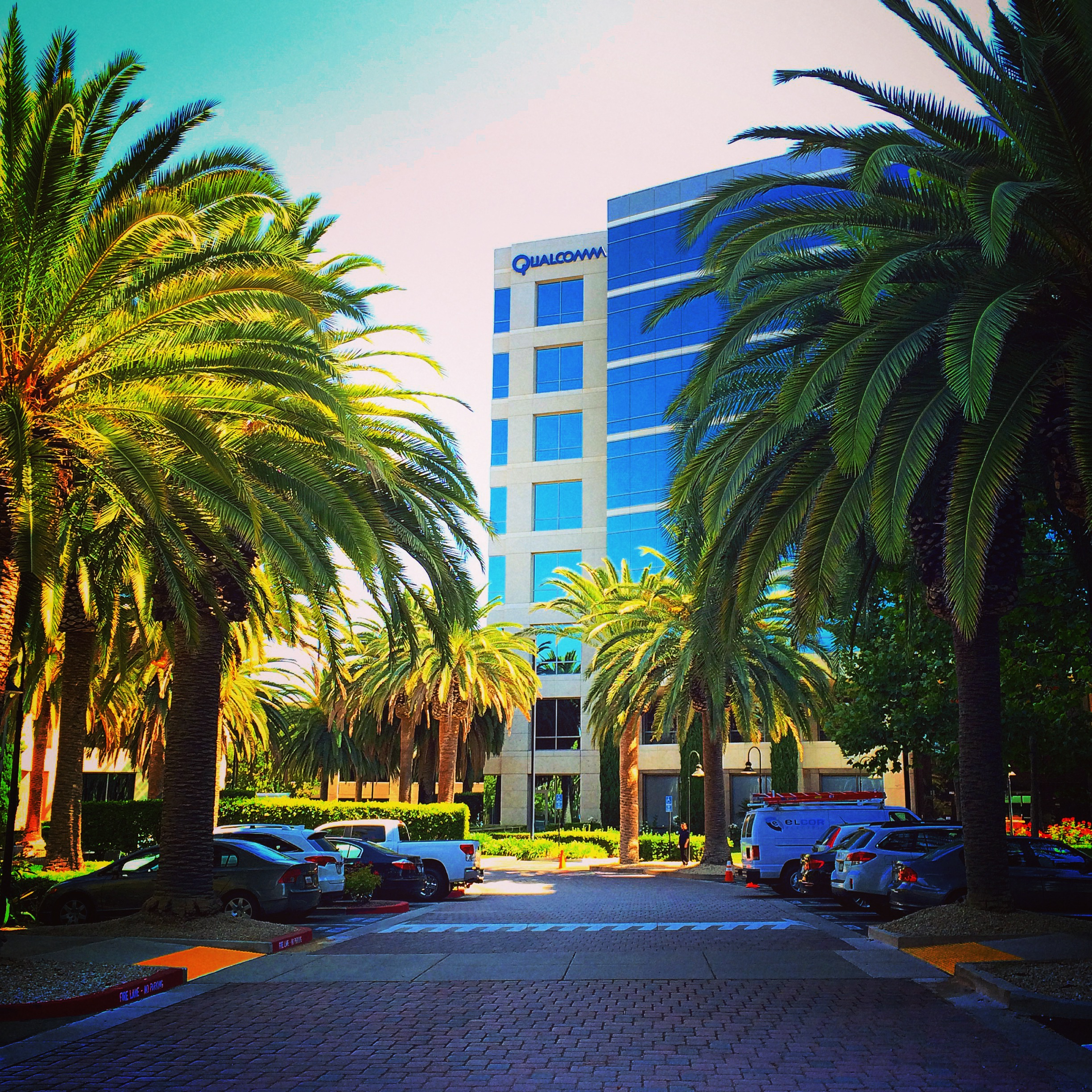
- Original headquarters in San Jose, California, under ownership of Qualcomm
- Formerly: T-Span Systems, Inc. (1998–2000)
- Type: Public
- Traded as: Nasdaq: ATHR
- Founded: May 1998
- Founder: Teresa H. Meng, John L. Hennessy
- Defunct: May 2011; 15 years ago
- Fate: Acquired by Qualcomm
- Successor: Qualcomm Atheros
- Headquarters: San Jose, California, U.S.
- Key people: Craig H. Barratt (CEO, 2003-2011); Jack Lazar (CFO, 2003-2011); Rick Bahr (Head of Engineering, 2000-2013); Bill McFarland (CTO, 1999-2015); Colin Born (Corporate Development, 2005-2014)
- Products: Ethernet, WLAN, Bluetooth, GPS, powerline communications, hybrid wired/wireless, location
- Website: atheros.com at the Wayback Machine (archived 2009-03-03)

Other logo of Atheros

Atheros Communications, Inc. was an American computer networking company independently active from 1998 to 2011. It produced semiconductor chips for network communications, particularly wireless chipsets. The company was founded under the name T-Span Systems in 1998 by experts in signal processing and VLSI design from Stanford University, the University of California, Berkeley, and private industry. The company was renamed Atheros Communications in 2000 and it completed an initial public offering in February 2004, trading on the NASDAQ under the symbol ATHR.

On January 5, 2011, it was announced that Qualcomm had agreed to a takeover of the company for a valuation of US$3.7 billion. When the acquisition was completed on May 24, 2011, Atheros became a subsidiary of Qualcomm operating under the name Qualcomm Atheros.

Qualcomm Atheros chipsets for the IEEE 802.11 standard of wireless networking are used by over 30 different wireless device manufacturers.

== History ==
T-Span Systems, Inc. was co-founded in 1998 by Teresa Meng, professor of engineering at Stanford University and John L. Hennessy, provost at the time and subsequently president of Stanford University.

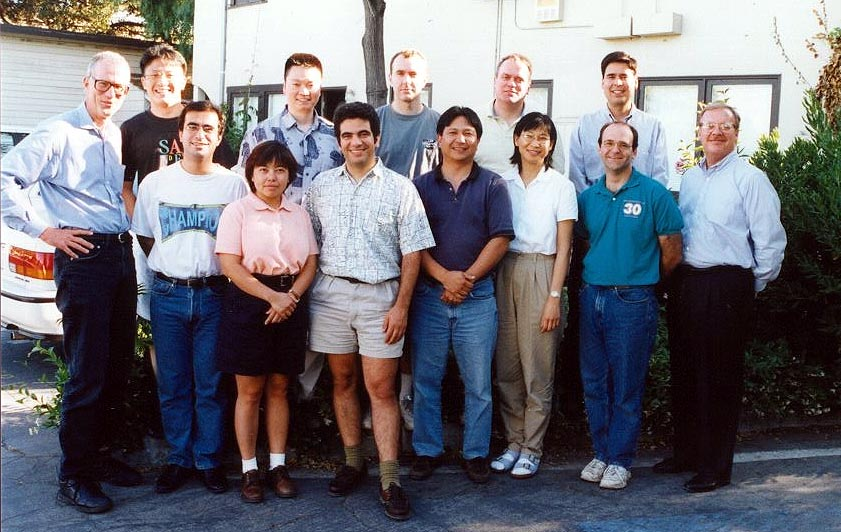
TSpan team mid-1999 in front of the Encina Avenue house in Palo Alto

The company's first office was a converted house on Encina Avenue, Palo Alto, adjacent to a car wash and Town & Country Village. In September 1999, the company moved to an office at 3145 Porter Drive, Building A, Palo Alto.

In 2000, T-Span Systems was renamed Atheros Communications and the company moved to a larger office at 529 Almanor Avenue, Sunnyvale. Atheros publicly demonstrated its inaugural chipset, the world's first WLAN implemented in CMOS technology and the first high-speed 802.11a 5 GHz technology.

In 2002, Atheros announced a dual-band wireless product, the AR5001X 802.11a/b. In 2002, Craig H. Barratt joined Atheros as vice president and in March 2003 became CEO.

In 2003, the company shipped its 10-millionth wireless chip. In 2004, Atheros unveiled a number of products, including the first video chipset for mainstream HDTV-quality wireless connectivity.

In 2004, Atheros disclosed its Super-G compression protocol to double the performance of 802.11/g. This was a major event in this history of the company and drove a great deal of sales and growth.

In 2005, Atheros introduced the industry's first MIMO-enabled WLAN chip, as well as the ROCm family for mobile handsets and portable consumer electronics.

In 2006, Atheros announced its XSPAN product line, which featured a single-chip, triple-radio for 802.11n. In this same year, it began to collaborate with Qualcomm on a product for CDMA and WCDMA-enabled handsets.

In 2008, Atheros announced the Align 1-stream 802.11n product line for PCs and networking equipment.

In 2010, Atheros shipped its 500-millionth WLAN chipset and 100-millionth Align 1-stream chipset. They released the first HomePlug AV chipset with a 500 Mbit/s PHY rate.

=== IPO ===
On February 12, 2004, Atheros completed its initial public offering on the NASDAQ exchange trading under the symbol ATHR. Shares opened at $14 per share with 9 million offered. Prices on the first day ranged up to $18.45 and closed at $17.60 per share. At the time, Atheros had approximately 170 employees.

=== Acquisition by Qualcomm ===
Logo of Qualcomm Atheros

In January 2011, Qualcomm agreed to acquire Atheros at $45 per share cash. This agreement was subject to shareholder regulatory approvals. In May 2011, Qualcomm completed its acquisition of Atheros Communications for a total of US$3.7 billion. Atheros became a subsidiary of Qualcomm under the name Qualcomm Atheros.

After the acquisition, the division unveiled the WCN3660 Combo Chip, which integrated dual-band Wi-Fi, Bluetooth, and FM into Qualcomm Snapdragon mobile processors. Qualcomm Atheros launched the Skifta media shifting application for Android and released the first HomePlug Green PHY at the end of the year.

In 2012, Qualcomm Atheros announced a Wi-Fi display product at the Consumer Electronics Show 2012, along with a new chip for HomePlug AV power line networking. At Mobile World Congress 2012, Qualcomm Atheros demonstrated a suite of 802.11ac enabled products. This included the WCN3680, a mobile 802.11ac combo chip targeting smartphones and tablets. In June 2012 at Computex, Qualcomm Atheros added new 802.11ac products.

In 2015, Qualcomm Atheros released the QCA9531 system-on chip (SoC), which is an 802.11n 2x2 2.4 GHz Wi-Fi SoC for WLAN platforms, with CPU clock speed up to 650 MHz, supporting DDR2 or DDR1 memory.

== Products ==
- WLAN – Qualcomm Atheros offers wireless connectivity products, including its Align 1-stream 802.11n chips, and the XSPAN 2-stream with SST2 and 3-stream with SST3 chips for 802.11n. The Align 1 also supports WLAN for mobile with up to 150 Mbit/s PHY rates for smartphones and portable consumer electronics. Qualcomm Atheros also offers legacy WLAN designs for 802.11a/g.
- PAS/PHS In March 2005, Atheros launched the AR1900, which was the first chip to combine a cellular transceiver, application processor, baseband functionality, audio paths, power management, as well as keypad, display and USB interfaces for the PHS mobile network, which was mainly used in China, Japan and Taiwan.
- Power line communication (PLC) – Atheros is a member of the HomePlug Powerline Alliance and its AR1500 line supports the IEEE 1901 standard.
- Ethernet – Qualcomm Atheros offers the ETHOS line of Ethernet interfaces, as well as the low-energy EDGE line, which supports the IEEE 802.3az-2010 Energy Efficient standard.
- Hybrid Networking – Qualcomm Atheros' hybrid networking technology, Hy-Fi, integrates WLAN, PLC, and Ethernet technologies. According to Atheros, the technology complies with the IEEE 1905.1 standard.
- Location Technology – In 2012, Qualcomm Atheros announced its IZat location technology. The technology uses multiple sources, such as satellites and WLAN networks, to pinpoint the location of the user.
- Bluetooth – Qualcomm Atheros offers Bluetooth chips for a variety of platforms. The company also offers integrated combo WLAN and Bluetooth chips.
- PON – Qualcomm Atheros passive optical network (PON) technologies incorporate standards such as IEEE 802.3ah, multiple-channel, software-based, digital signal processing for the G.711 and G.729 ITU standards for VoIP, and TR-156 Broadband Forum PON standard.

== Acquisitions ==
- CodeTelligence – SDIO software/firmware developer, acquired in 2005.
- ZyDAS Technology – a USB Wireless LAN company headquartered in Hsinchu, Taiwan, acquired in 2006.
- Attansic Technology – a Fast and Gigabit Ethernet chip maker headquartered in Taiwan, acquired in early 2007.
- u-Nav Microelectronics – a GPS chipmaker headquartered in Irvine, CA, acquired in 2007.
- Intellon Corporation – a public company with powerline communication (PLC) for home networking, networked entertainment, broadband-over-powerline (BPL) access, Ethernet-over-Coax (EoC), and smart grid management applications. They were acquired in late 2009.
- Opulan Technology Corp – EPON broadband access technology developer in Shanghai, China, acquired in August 2010.
- Bigfoot Networks – an Austin, Texas-based company acquired in September 2011, with application-aware networking technologies that are being marketed under the trademarked brand-name of StreamBoost.
- Ubicom – a company known for its processor and software designed to optimize network data, acquired in February 2012.
- DesignArt – small cell chip company that combined several radio technologies on a single chip, used to provide wireless backhaul to smaller base stations. Acquired in August 2012.
- Wilocity - a fabless semiconductor company focusing on IEEE 802.11ad (60 GHz) was purchased by Qualcomm in July 2014.

== Free and open-source software support ==
Support for Atheros devices on Linux and FreeBSD once relied on the hobbyist project MadWifi, originally created by Sam Leffler and later supported by Greg Chesson. MadWifi later evolved into ath5k. In July 2008, Atheros released an open-source Linux driver called ath9k for its 802.11n devices. Atheros also released some source from its binary HAL under ISC license to add support for its abg chips. Atheros has since been actively contributing towards the ath9k driver in Linux. Atheros has also been providing documentation and assistance to the FreeBSD community to enable updated support for 802.11n chipsets in FreeBSD-9.0 and up.

The flexibility and openness of ath9k makes it a prime candidate for experiments around improving Wi-Fi. It is the first subject of a FQ-CoDel-based radio fairness improvement experiment by Make-Wifi-Fast. The driver has also been modified by radio hobbyists to broadcast in licensed frequency bands.

The article comparison of open-source wireless drivers lists free and open-source software drivers available for all Qualcomm Atheros IEEE 802.11 chipsets. The most recent generations of Atheros wireless cards (802.11ac and 802.11ax) require non-free binary blob firmware to work, whereas earlier generations generally do not require non-free firmware.

Atheros was featured in OpenBSD's songs that relate to the ongoing efforts of freeing non-free devices.
