= IEEE 1675-2008 =

IEEE standard for broadband over power lines

IEEE 1675-2008 was a standard for broadband over power lines developed by the IEEE Standards Association. It provided electric utility companies with a comprehensive standard for safely installing hardware required for Internet access capabilities over their power lines.

The standard was published 7 January 2008. The IEEE 1901 standard was another related attempt published in 2011.

== See also ==
- Power-line communication
