= SPiDCOM =

SPiDCOM Technologies
- Company type: Private
- Industry: Semiconductors
- Founded: 2002
- Founder: Radomir Jovanovic
- Headquarters: Paris, France
- Products: Power line communication system-on-a-chip
- Website: www.spidcom.com

SPiDCOM Technologies was a France-based company that specialized in integrated circuits and Linux-based software bundles for Multimedia Home Networking and other wire based applications . MStar Semiconductor acquired SPiDCOM in November 2011.

== Products ==
Radomir Jovanovic founded SPiDCOM in September 2002 as subsidiary to a group that included ELSYS Design in Paris, where the initial project started. Known as a fabless semiconductor company, SPiDCOM designed system-on-a-chip integrated circuits and Linux based firmware for computer network communications over wires such as electrical power, coaxial cables, and telephone lines. Applications included audio and video home networking, Internet access (often called "broadband"), and energy conservation. Its first product was the SPC200 launched in 2005, and the SPC300, announced in 2009. A reference design was announced in 2010.

== Standards ==
SPiDCOM participated in standardization efforts inside international regulatory and standards bodies, such as the European Telecommunications Standards Institute, the Home Gateway Initiative and IEEE 1901. SPiDCOM had a board member of the HomePlug Powerline Alliance. OMEGA was a project, funded from 2008 through 2011 by the European Union, to develop a 1 Gbit/s home network over power lines, radio wireless and optical wireless. SPiDCOM participated with the OMEGA Project, leading the powerline communication work package.
