= Broadband over power lines =

Technology to send internet signals over conventional power line grids

Broadband over power lines (BPL) is a method of power-line communication (PLC) that allows relatively high-speed digital data transmission over public electric power distribution wiring. BPL uses higher frequencies, a wider frequency range, and different technologies compared to other forms of power-line communications to provide high-rate communication over longer distances. BPL uses frequencies that are part of the radio spectrum allocated to over-the-air communication services; therefore, the prevention of interference to, and from, these services is a very important factor in designing BPL systems.

There are two main categories of BPL: in-house and access. In-house BPL is broadband access within a building or structure using the electric lines of the structure to provide the network infrastructure. Access BPL is the use of electrical transmission lines to deliver broadband to the home. Access BPL is considered a viable alternative to cable or DSL to provide the 'last mile' of broadband to end users.

== History ==
BPL is based on PLC technology developed as far back as 1914 by the U.S. telecommunications company AT&T. In 1990s, BPL emerged as a means of leveraging the pervasiveness of the power grid to deliver high-speed broadband communications. The aim was to expand internet access to areas where traditional wired broadband solutions like DSL or cable were not readily available or economically viable.

In order to achieve high bandwidth levels, BPL operates at higher frequencies than traditional power line communications, typically in the range between 2–80 MHz. The modulation techniques of BPL are either frequency division multiplexing (FDM) or orthogonal frequency division multiplexing (OFDM), which are both superior to spread spectrum or narrowband for spectral efficiency, robustness against channel distortions, and the ability to adapt to channel changes. Electricity companies have been bundling radio frequency on the same line as the electrical current to monitor the performance of their own power grids for years. There have been attempts to implement access BPL, or the provision of internet services to customers via the grid. The prospect of BPL was predicted in 2004 to possibly motivate DSL and cable operators to serve rural communities.

More recently, decarbonization is leading to a significant increase in generation plants, storage devices, and consumers at lower voltage levels, causing capacity issues in distribution grids. Traditional central control becomes not feasible for lower levels due to the vast number of units. Energy utility companies such as E.ON, start to adopt BPL as a key communication technology to enable real-time, high-speed decentralized control of the grid.

== How BPL works ==
Broadband Over Power Lines (BPL) works as specialized modems to convert data into signals and transmit alongside power lines, This process ensures consistent broadband connectivity through demodulation, data distribution, and interference mitigation.

1. Modulation: BPL technology utilizes specific modems to transform digital data into signals that are suitable for power line transmission. Various modulation techniques, such as frequency division multiplexing (FDM) or orthogonal frequency division multiplexing (OFDM), are employed. These techniques allow the combination of data signals with the power signals on the electrical lines.
2. Injection: After modulating the digital data, BPL modems inject the signals to the power lines at substations or distribution points. These data signals merge with the pre-existing alternating current (AC) power, leveraging the existing infrastructure without the need for extra cables.
3. Signal propagation: The injected BPL signals propagate through the power lines, utilizing them as transmission mediums. These signals travel along the electrical wiring, making their way to the destination points, such as homes or businesses. The power lines act as conduits for the BPL signals to reach their intended receivers.
4. Reception: At the consumer end, BPL modems receive the signals from the power lines. These modems are typically connected to routers or other networking devices, allowing the distribution of the internet connection to multiple devices within the premises. The BPL modems serve as the interface between the power lines and the local area network (LAN).
5. Demodulation: The BPL modems demodulate the received signals, separating the data packets from the power. This process involves extracting the original digital data from the modulated carrier signals. Demodulation allows the recovery of the transmitted information for further processing.
6. Data distribution: Once demodulated, the data packets are forwarded to the connected routers or networking devices. These devices handle the distribution of the internet connection to various devices within the premises, such as computers, smartphones, or smart home devices. The router or networking devices act as gateways for data transmission and reception.
7. Repeaters and amplifiers: In larger BPL deployments, repeaters or amplifiers may be installed along the power lines to boost the signal strength and extend coverage. These devices ensure that the BPL signals maintain sufficient quality and reach distant locations.( Repeaters receive and regenerate the BPL signals, enabling their propagation over longer distances without significant degradation.)
8. Interference mitigation: BPL systems need incorporate measures to manage interference for consistent data transmission. Specific filtering methods are utilized to address radio frequency interference (RFI) associated with BPL signals. These filters aim to limit BPL's influence on adjacent radio communications. Compliance with established regulations and industry norms ensures proper interference mitigation measures.
9. Quality and reliability: BPL system performance is influenced by several elements. These include the condition of the electrical wiring, proximity to BPL equipment, and potential signal interference. High-quality wiring and maintaining an adequate signal-to-noise ratio is crucial for a BPL to function effectively.

== Key characteristics of BPL ==
1. Utilization of existing infrastructure: One of the key characteristics of BPL is its capacity to utilize existing power lines. This avoids the demand for significant construction or additional cable installation, positioning it as an economical option for expanding broadband coverage.
2. High-speed data communication: BPL technology enables high-speed data communication over existing power lines, offering comparable speeds to traditional wired broadband technologies like DSL or cable. This allows for efficient transmission of large amounts of data, supporting bandwidth-intensive applications.
3. Wide coverage: The existing power grid covers a vast area, making BPL capable of reaching homes, businesses, and other locations that may be difficult to connect with other wired broadband technologies.
4. Flexibility and scalability: BPL enables flexibility and scalability in terms of extending network coverage. Additional modems can be added at distribution points or substations to expand the reach of the BPL network. This adaptability allows for gradual expansion as demand increases or new areas require connectivity.
5. Potential for smart grid integration: BPL can facilitate the integration of smart grid applications, enabling bidirectional communication between power utilities and consumers. It enables remote management for energy efficiency, real-time monitoring, and the implementation of demand-response systems, leading to enhanced grid resilience and energy conservation.
6. Coexistence with power signals: BPL operates alongside the power signals on the same power lines. It utilizes modulation techniques to ensure that the data signals do not interfere with the power grid's normal functioning. This coexistence minimizes the need for dedicated infrastructure and simplifies implementation.

== Implementation challenges ==
Power lines were not designed for data transmission, they were created to deliver AC power at 50–60 Hz. If broadband data is transmitted at much higher frequencies, that are easily separated from the super low frequency power current, so that the data and electricity can travel in the same wire and be extracted separately; however, several obstacles have to be overcome to enable the high-speed and long-distance transmission of data along existing power lines.

Deployment of BPL has illustrated a number of fundamental challenges, the primary one being that power lines are inherently a very noisy environment. Every time a device turns on or off, it introduces a pop or click into the line. Switching power supplies often introduce noisy harmonics into the line. And unlike coaxial cable or twisted-pair, the wiring has no inherent tendency to reject noise picked up in line segments between power transformers.

The second major issue is electromagnetic compatibility (EMC). The system was expected to use frequencies of 10–30 MHz in the high frequency (HF) range, used for decades by military, aeronautical, amateur radio, and shortwave broadcasters. Power lines are unshielded and will act as antennas for the signals they carry, and they will cause interference to high frequency radio communications and broadcasting. In 2007, the NATO Research and Technology Organization (RTO) released a report which concluded that widespread deployment of BPL may have a "possible detrimental effect upon military HF radio communications."

== Deployments ==
There have been many attempts worldwide to implement access BPL, all which have indicated that BPL is not viable as a means of delivering broadband Internet access. This is because of two problems: Limited reach, and low bandwidth, neither of which even comes close to matching ADSL, Wi-Fi, and even 3G mobile. World major providers have either limited their BPL deployments to low-bandwidth connected equipment via smart grids, or ceased BPL operations altogether.

Australia saw trials of access BPL between 2004–2007, but no active access BPL deployments appear to remain there.

In the U.K., the BBC published the results of tests to detect interference from BPL installations.

In October 2004, the U.S. Federal Communications Commission adopted rules to facilitate the deployment of "Access BPL" – the marketing term for Internet access service over power lines. The technical rules are more liberal than those advanced by the US national amateur radio organization, the American Radio Relay League (ARRL), and other spectrum users, but include provisions that require BPL providers to investigate and correct any interference they cause.

One service, Current Communications, announced coverage in 2004 for Ohio, Kentucky, and Indiana, but then left the BPL business in 2008.

On 3 August 2006, the FCC adopted a memorandum opinion and an order on broadband over power lines, giving the go-ahead to promote broadband service to all Americans. The order rejected calls from aviation, business, commercial, amateur radio, and other sectors of spectrum users to limit or prohibit deployment until further study was completed. Kevin Martin, then Chairman of the FCC, said that BPL "holds great promise as a ubiquitous broadband solution that would offer a viable alternative to cable, digital subscriber line, fiber, and wireless broadband solutions".

International Broadband Electric Communications (IBEC), which had an ambitious plan to provide access BPL in the U.S., ceased BPL operations in January 2012.

On 19 January 2018, E.ON, the German multinational electric utility company, serving about 48 million customers across several European countries, decided to use BPL in the low-voltage segment of their grid for communication with their smart metering devices. The utility chose Corinex as the provider for the initial two years of the deployment. The initial deployment was several ten thousand repeaters and headends, providing secure communication for meters at about 200,000 households. The utility selected Corinex GridValue energy management system, using the IBM Tivoli platform, to manage the network.

== Standards ==
Several standards are evolving for BPL technology including those of the IEEE, the HomePlug Powerline Alliance (defunct), the PRIME Alliance, and Nessum Alliance. (see below)

== Failure scenarios ==
There are many ways in which the communication signal may have error introduced into it. Interference, cross chatter, some active devices, and some passive devices all introduce noise or attenuation into the signal. When error becomes significant the devices controlled by the unreliable signal may fail, become inoperative, or operate in an undesirable fashion.

1. Interference: Interference from nearby systems can cause signal degradation as the modem may not be able to determine a specific frequency among many signals in the same bandwidth.
2. Signal degradation by active devices: Devices such as relays, transistors, and rectifiers create noise in their respective systems, increasing the likelihood of signal degradation. Arc-fault circuit interrupter (AFCI) devices, required by some recent electrical codes for living spaces, may also attenuate the signals.
3. Signal attenuation by passive devices: Transformers and DC–DC converters attenuate the input frequency signal almost completely. "Bypass" devices become necessary for the signal to be passed on to the receiving node. A bypass device may consist of three stages, a filter in series with a protection stage and coupler, placed in parallel with the passive device.

== See also ==
- Broadband
- HD-PLC (Nessum)
- IEEE 1901
- List of broadband over power line deployments
- National broadband plans from around the world
- Nessum
- Power-line communication
- Power-over-fiber

== IEEE documents related to BPL technology ==
- IEEE 643-2004 "Guide for Power-Line Carrier Applications" is a standard for communication over the transmission line network (above 69 kV).

IEEE Guide for Power-Line Carrier Applications (Report). Institute of Electrical and Electronics Engineers (IEEE). 2005. doi:10.1109/IEEESTD.2005.96284. ISBN 978-0-7381-4068-1.

- IEEE P1675 "Standard for Broadband over Power Line Hardware" is a working group working on hardware installation and safety issues.

"Standard for Broadband over Power Line Hardware". IEEE. Institute of Electrical and Electronics Engineers (IEEE). May 2008. P1675-D7.

- IEEE P1775 "Powerline Communication Equipment - Electromagnetic Compatibility (EMC) Requirements - Testing and Measurement Methods" is a working group focused on PLC equipment, electromagnetic compatibility requirements, and testing and measurement methods.

IEEE Draft Standard for Powerline Communication Equipment - Electromagnetic Compatibility (EMC) Requirements - Testing and Measurements Methods (Report) (IEEE unapproved draft ed.). Institute of Electrical and Electronics Engineers (IEEE). March 2009. STD P1775/1.9.7.

- IEEE P1901-2020 "IEEE Standard for Broadband over Power Line Networks: Medium access control and physical layer specifications" is a working group standard for delivering broadband over power lines. The aim is to define medium access control and physical layer specifications for all classes of BPL devices - from long distance connections to those within subscriber premises.

"Amendment 1: Enhancement for internet of things applications". IEEE Standard for Broadband over Power Line Networks: Medium access control and physical layer specifications. Institute of Electrical and Electronics Engineers (IEEE). 2019. doi:10.1109/IEEESTD.2019.8710016. ISBN 978-1-5044-5679-1. IEEE STD 1901a.
