= Combined Charging System =

Electric vehicle charging standard

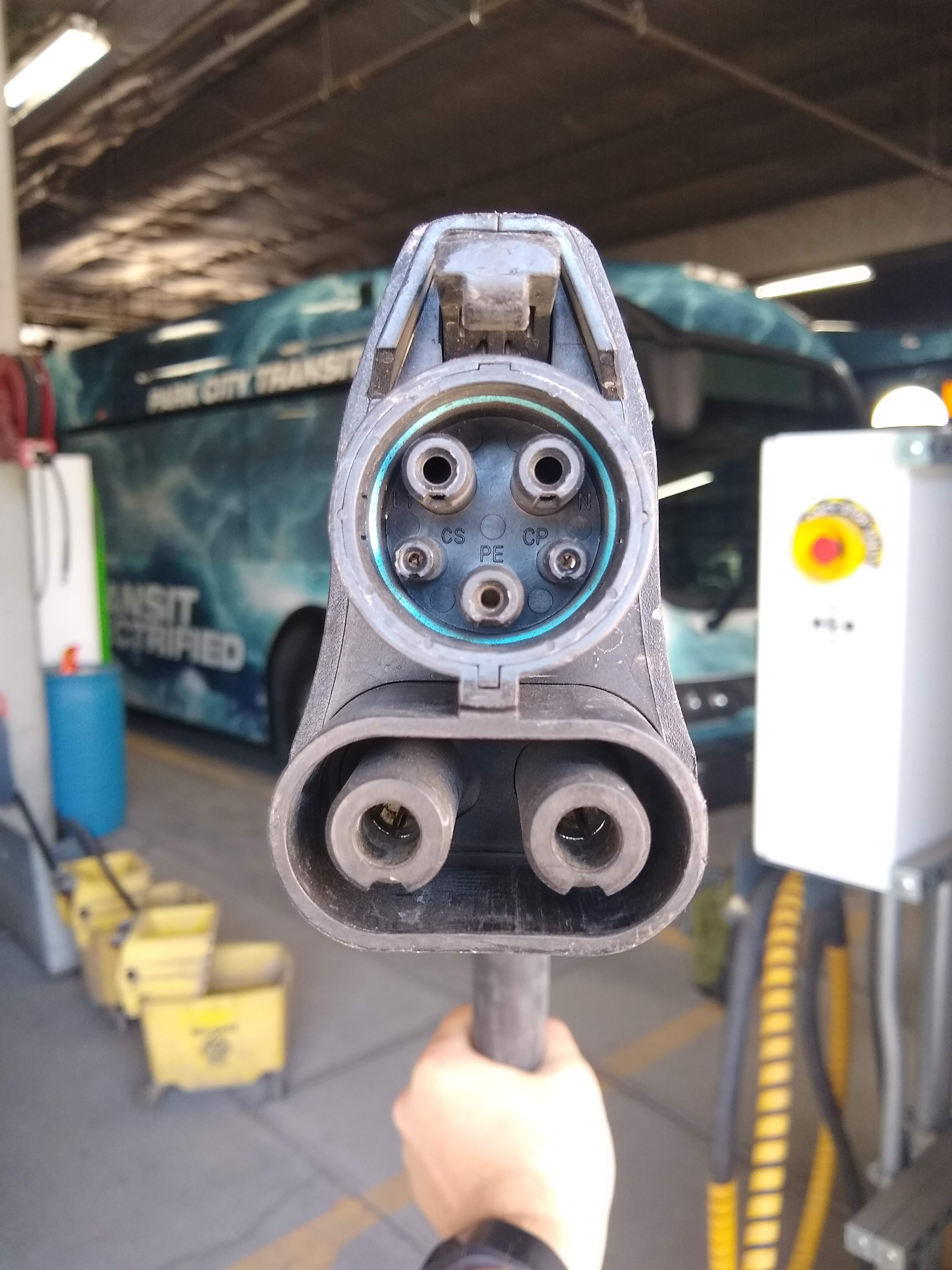
CCS1 (Combined Charging System Combo 1) plug as used in North America. It is an extension of the J1772 standard AC charging connector.

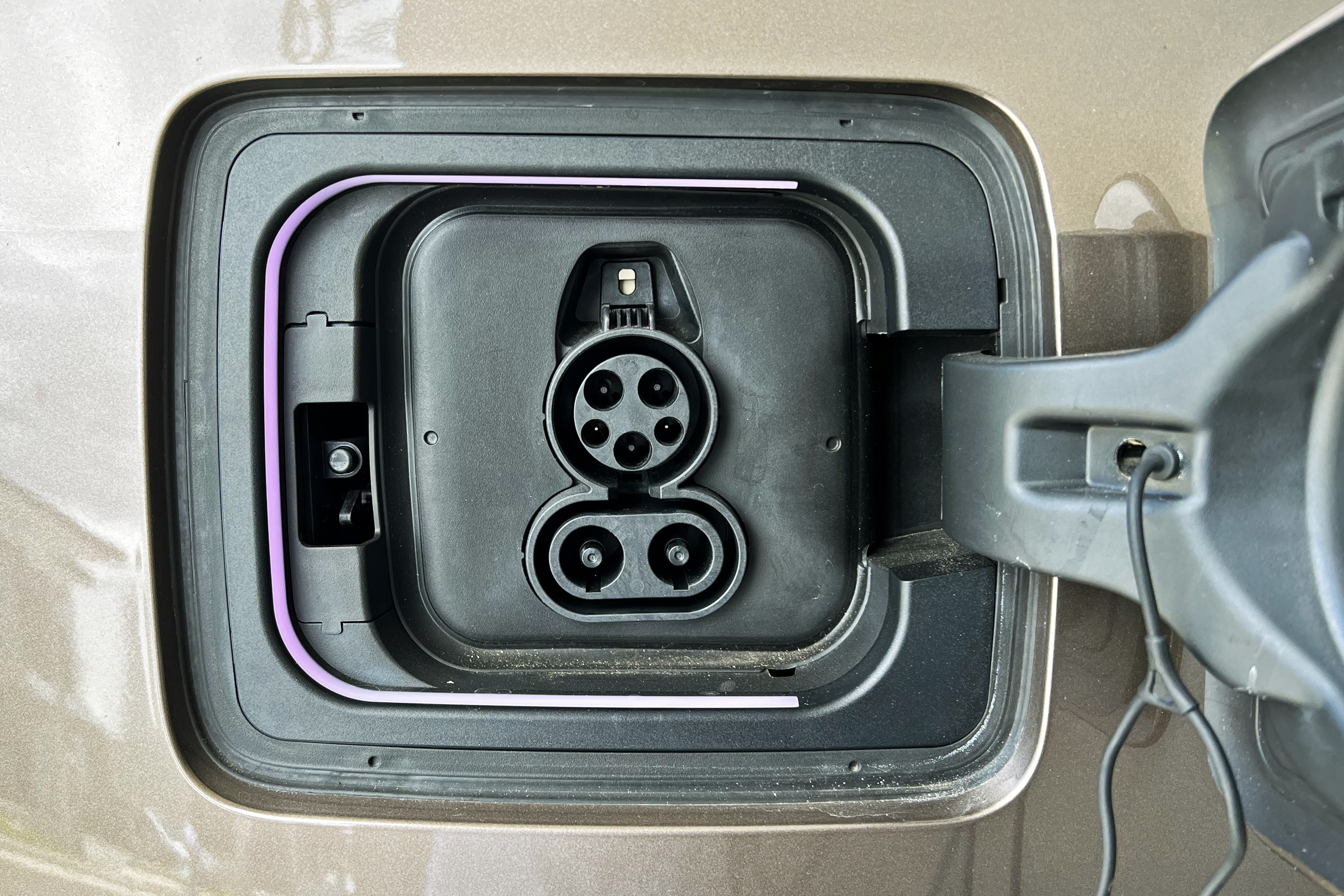
CCS Combo 1 vehicle inlet showing the J1772 and the two DC fast-charging pins

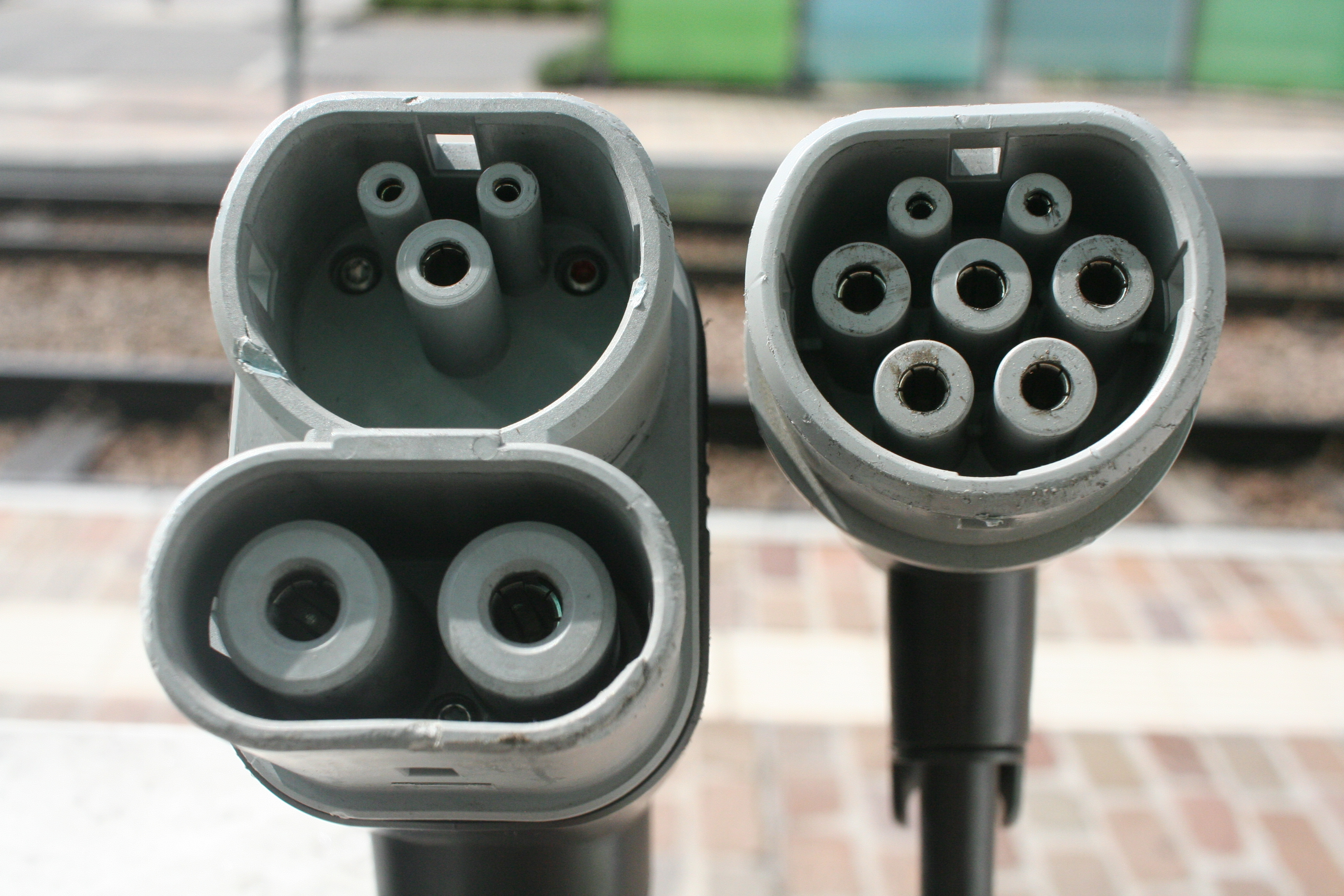
Connectors: Incomplete Combo 2 (left) showing the two large direct current (DC) pins below, while the four alternating current (AC) pins for neutral and three-phase are removed, while the signal pins of Type 2 remain, compared to IEC Type 2 (right).

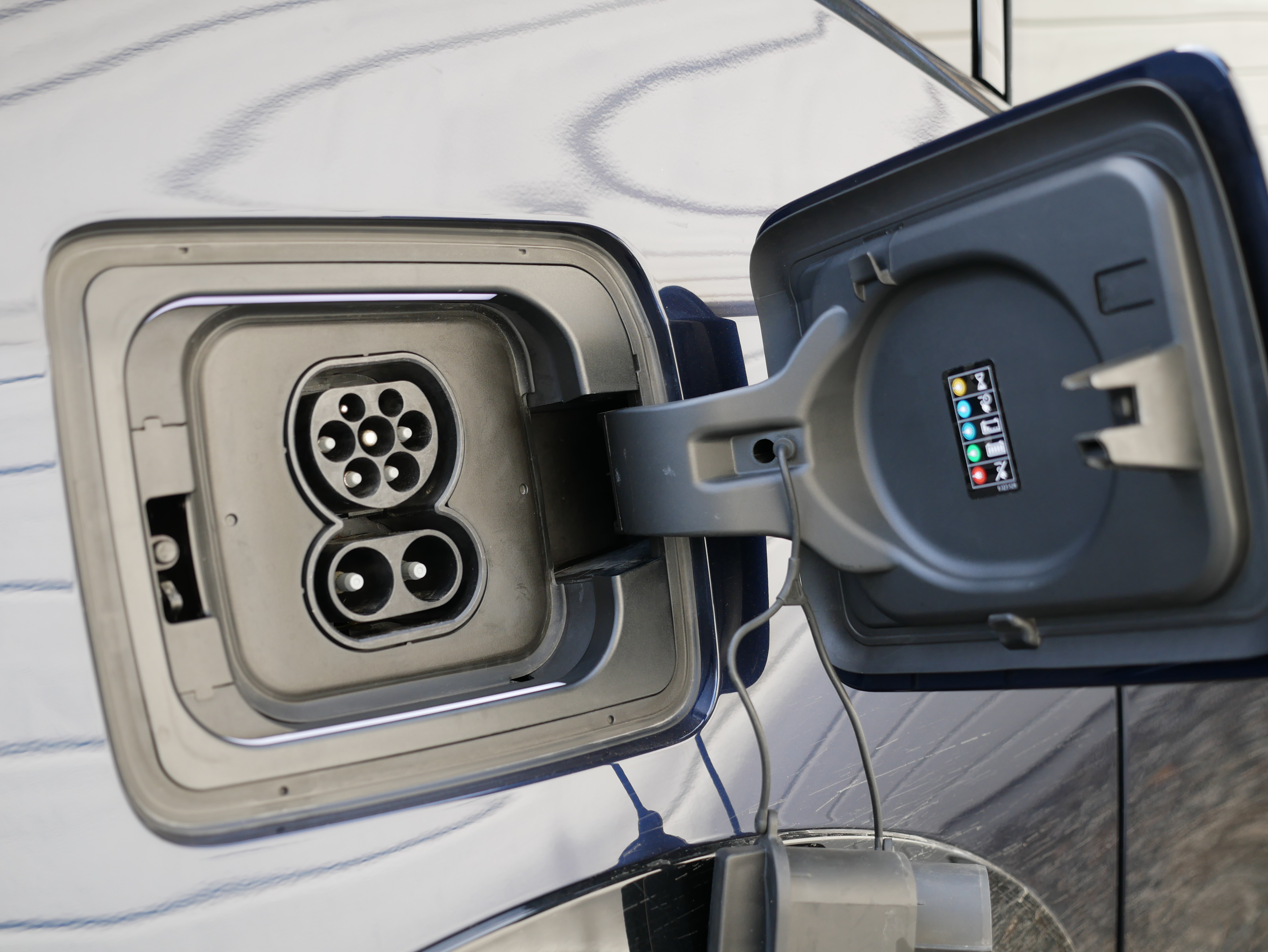
Typical Combined Charging System (Combo 2) vehicle inlet

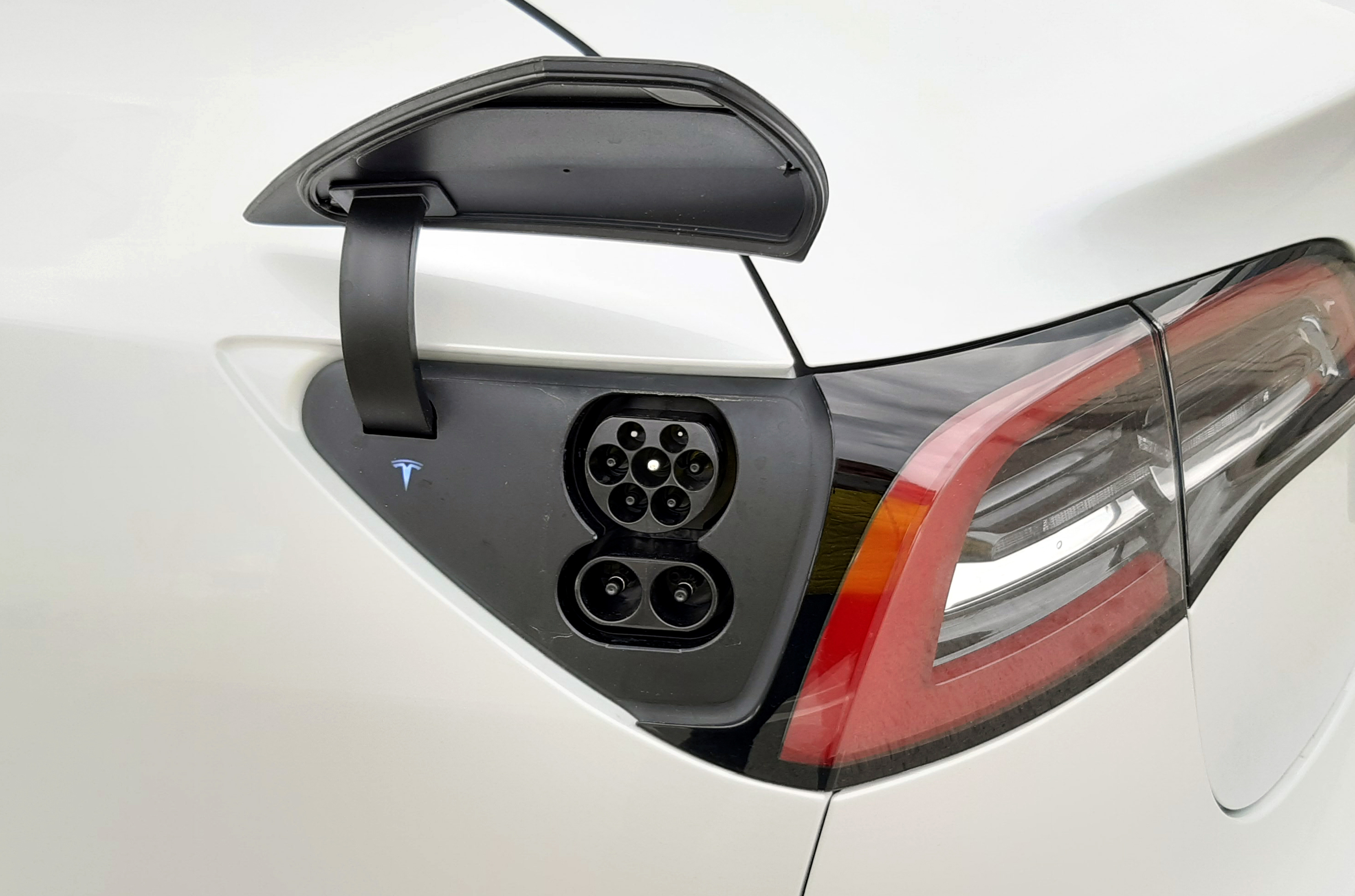
CCS Combo 2 at European Tesla Model 3 vehicle inlet

The Combined Charging System (CCS) is a charging station standard for plug-in electric vehicles that uses the Combo 1 (CCS1) or Combo 2 (CCS2) connectors, which are extensions of the IEC 62196 Type 1 and Type 2 alternating current (AC) connectors, respectively, each with two additional direct current (DC) contacts to allow high-power fast charging. CCS chargers can provide power to electric vehicle batteries at up to 500 kW (max. 1000 V and 500 A), and in response to demands for even faster charging, 400 kW CCS chargers have been deployed by charging networks and 990 kW CCS chargers have been demonstrated.

Electric vehicles and electric vehicle supply equipment (EVSE) are considered CCS-capable if they support either AC or DC charging according to the CCS standards. Manufacturers that support CCS include BMW, Daimler, FCA, Jaguar, Groupe PSA, Honda, Hyundai, Kia, Lucid, Mazda, MG, Nissan, Polestar, Renault, Rivian, Tesla, Mahindra, Tata Motors and Volkswagen Group, as well as Ford and General Motors for their 2024 North American EV models. Chinese automakers such as BYD, Chery and Zeekr also export CCS2 vehicles for their overseas markets.

The CCS standard allows AC charging using the Type 1 and Type 2 connector depending on the geographical region and the charging infrastructure available. This charging environment encompasses charging couplers, charging communication, charging stations, the electric vehicle and various functions for the charging process such as load balancing and charge authorization. Competing charging systems for high-power DC charging include CHAdeMO (widely used in Japan, previously used in North America and Europe), GB/T (China), and the North American Charging System developed by Tesla.

== History ==
The revival of interest in electric cars in the 1990s spurred deployment of charging stations. Initially, these accessed the abundant AC mains electricity using a variety of plugs around the world. From 2003, the standardization in IEC 62196 of higher-current charging connectors brought about various systems: Type 1 was used primarily in North America and Japan, and Type 2 variants elsewhere. For DC charging, the SAE and European Automobile Manufacturers Association (ACEA) made a plan in 2011 to add common DC wires to the existing AC connector types such that there would be only one "global envelope" that fitted all DC charging stations.

Combo connector for DC charging (using only the signal pins of Type 2) and the Combo inlet on the vehicle (allowing also AC charging)

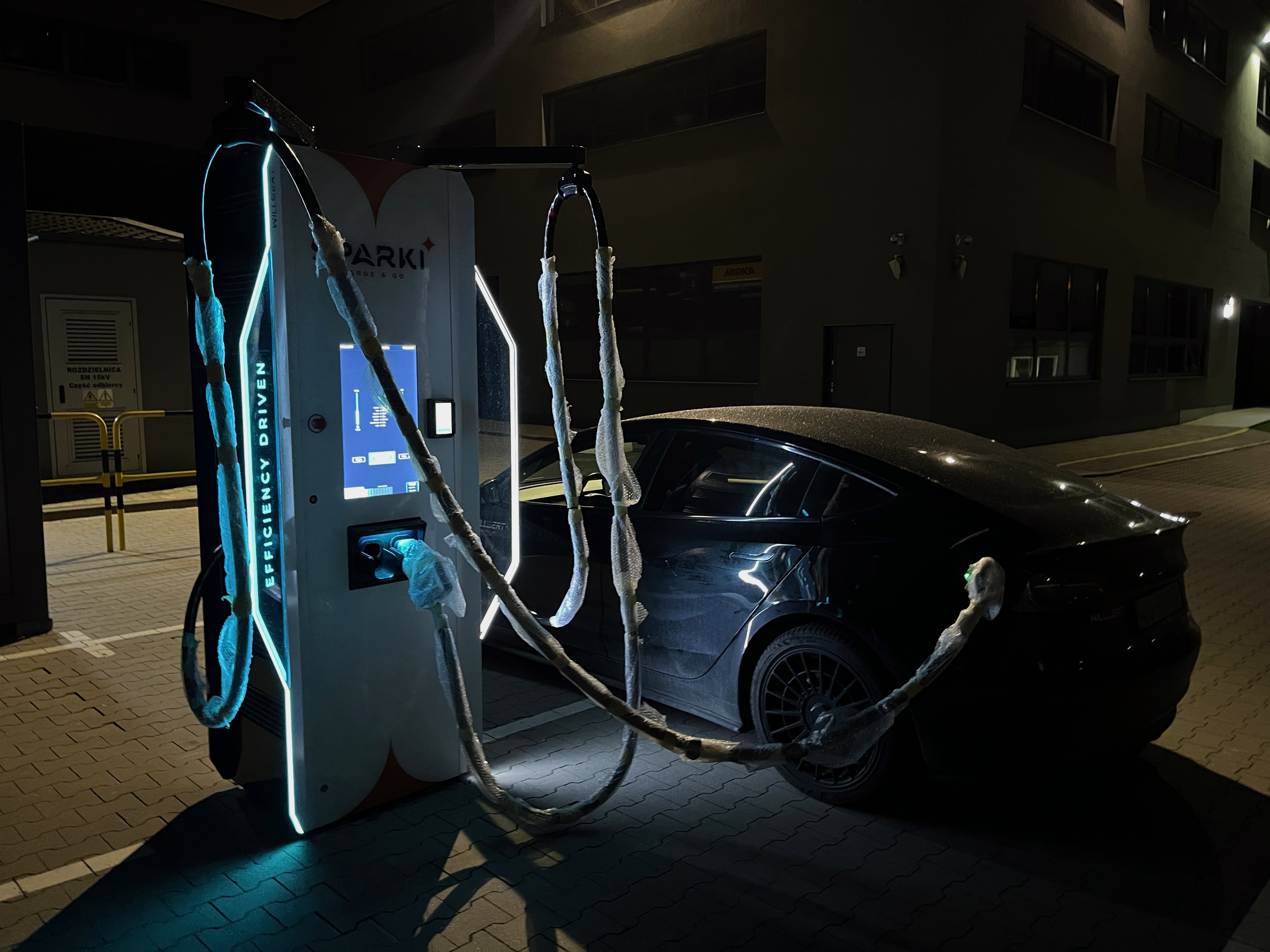
Electric car charging with CCS

The proposal for a "Combined Charging System" (CCS) was published at the 15th International VDI-Congress (Association of German Engineers) on 12 October 2011 in Baden-Baden. CCS defines a single connector pattern on the vehicle side that offers enough space for a Type 1 or Type 2 connector, along with space for a two-pin DC connector allowing charging at up to 200 amps. Seven car makers (Audi, BMW, Daimler, Ford, General Motors, Porsche and Volkswagen) agreed in late 2011 to introduce CCS in mid-2012. In May 2012, ACEA endorsed the standardization of the Combo 2 connector across the European Union. ACEA were joined later that month by the European Association of Automotive Suppliers (CLEPA) and The Union of the Electricity Industry (EURELECTRIC). Also that month, prototype implementations for up to 100 kW were shown at EVS26 in Los Angeles. DC charging specifications in IEC 62196-3 (2014) give a range up to 125 A at up to 850 V.

The seven auto makers also agreed in 2011 to use HomePlug GreenPHY as the communication protocol. The prototype for the matching plug was developed by Phoenix Contact with the goal to withstand 10,000 connect cycles. The standardization proposal was sent to the IEC in January 2011. The request to use a PLC protocol for Vehicle2Grid communication was made in September 2009 in a joint presentation of BMW, Daimler and VW at a California Air Resources Board ZEV Technology Symposium. This competed with the CAN bus proposal from Japan (including CHAdeMO) and China (GB/T 20234.3, a separate DC connector standard), and none of their car manufacturers had signed up to CCS. However, China had been involved in early stages of the development of the extra DC pins.

Volkswagen built the first public CCS quick-charge station, providing 50 kW DC, in Wolfsburg in June 2013 to test drive the VW E-Up that was to be delivered with a DC rapid charger connector for CCS. Two weeks later, BMW opened its first CCS rapid charge station to support the BMW i3. Since at least the second EV World Summit in June 2013, the CHAdeMO association, Volkswagen and Nissan all advocate multi-standard DC chargers, as the additional cost of a dual-protocol station is only 5%.

Since 2014, the European Union has required the provision of Type 2 or Combo 2 within the European electric vehicle charging network.

In Germany, the Charging Interface Initiative e. V. (CharIN) was founded by car makers and suppliers (Audi, BMW, Daimler, Mennekes, Opel, Phoenix Contact, Porsche, TÜV SÜD and Volkswagen) to promote the adoption of CCS. They noted in a press release that most cars could not charge faster than 50 kW, so that was the first common power output of CCS stations to be built during 2015. The next step was the standardization of stations with 150 kW output that they showed in October 2015, looking to a future system with 350 kW output. Volvo joined CharIN in 2016; Tesla in March 2016; Lucid Motors (previously Atieva) June 2016; Faraday Future June 2016; and Toyota in March 2017.

In the United States, BMW and VW stated in April 2016 that the East Coast and West Coast corridors had "complete" CCS networks. As part of the 2016 settlement of the Volkswagen emissions scandal, VW committed to spend US$2 billion in the United States over the following 10 years on CCS and other charging infrastructure through subsidiary company Electrify America. In this effort, charging stations would be built with up to 150 kW at community-based locations and with up to 350 kW at highway locations. Besides CCS, CHAdeMO charging stations were to be constructed.

In November 2016, Ford, Mercedes, Audi, Porsche and BMW announced they would build a 350 kW (up to 500 A and 920 V) charge network (IONITY) with 400 stations in Europe, at a cost of €200,000 ($220,000) each. Most electric cars have a battery pack voltage below 400 volts. With a maximum charge current of 500 A, up to 220 kW charging is possible.

EVSE manufacturers offer CCS chargers capable of outputs beyond 350 kW. The Terra 360 from ABB supports up to 360 kW charging.

CCS chargers capable of 400 kW charging include:

- The Axon Easy 400 from Ekoenergetyka
- The HYC400 from Alpitronic
- The Troniq High Power from EVBox
- The Raption 400 HPC from Circontrol
- The 400 kW DP + 600 kW PC from SK Signet
- The Liquid Cooled Satellite from Kempower

In October 2019, Repsol deployed 400 kW CCS chargers near the A-8 motorway at Abanto-Zierbena, Biscay, Spain.

In May 2022, EUROLOOP announced 720 kW charger WILLBERT Amber II S-HUB to be deployed in 2023 across Belgium.

In December 2022, Fastned deployed EVBox Troniq High Power 400 kW chargers in De Watering, The Netherlands, along the A8 near Oostzaan as part of its charging network.

In April 2023, Nxu demonstrated a battery-backed, 700 kW CCS charger in Mesa, Arizona.

In May 2023, Shell opened a new station with 400 kW Kempower chargers in Lonelier outside Kristiansand, Norway.

In June 2023, XC Power opened a station with QiOn Technology at Supercool Mobility Centers, a group of chargers with main power up to 990 kW with non-cooled CCS1 (up to 240 kW), and a charging station with liquid cooling system, up to 990 kW in Puebla City, Mexico.

In first half of 2023, both Ford and General Motors announced that they would transition their North American EV lines from CCS1 to the NACS charge connector beginning with the 2025 model year. These company moves to a competing charging standard prompted a response from the Charging Interface Initiative (CharIN) association, which promotes the CCS standard. They pointed out in June 2023 that "NACS is not a published or recognized standard by any standards body. For any technology to become a standard it has to go through due process in a standards development organization, such as ISO, IEC, and/or SAE." A week later, SAE announced that it had standardized the NACS connector.

== Technical design ==
Terminology for charging components

=== Versions of the specifications ===
The Combined Charging System is meant to develop with the needs of the customer. Version 1.0 covered the currently common features of AC and DC charging, and version 2.0 addressed the near to midterm future. The specifications and underlying standards for CCS 1.0 and CCS 2.0 are described for DC charging in Table 1 and for AC charging in Table 2.

The automotive manufacturers supporting CCS committed themselves to migrate to CCS 2.0 in 2018. Thus it is recommended for charging station manufacturers to also support CCS 2.0 from 2018 onwards.

The specifications of CCS 3.0 were not yet precisely defined. All features of previous versions shall be preserved to ensure backward compatibility. Potential additional features include:

- Reverse power transfer
- Inductive charging
- Wireless charging communication
- Bus charging with "pantograph" current collector

=== Charging communication ===
Unlike the connector and inlet, which vary by geographical location, the charging communication is the same around the globe, and is generally of two types:

- Basic signaling (BS) uses a pulse-width modulation (PWM) signal which is transferred over the control pilot (CP) contact according to IEC 61851-1. This communication is used for safety-related functions, indicating for example if the connector is plugged in, before contacts are energized, and if both charging station and electric vehicle are ready for charging. AC charging is possible using the PWM signal only. In this case the charging station uses the duty cycle of the modulation to inform the onboard charger of the maximum available current. A pulse width of 5% indicates that high-level communication shall be used.
- High-level communication (also known as power line communication or PLC) is done by modulating a high-frequency signal over the CP contact to transfer more complex information, which may be used e.g. for DC charging or for other services such as "plug and charge" or load balancing. This communication is based on the standard DIN SPEC 70121 and the ISO/IEC 15118-series.

=== Load balancing ===
CCS differentiates between two methods of load balancing.

- Reactive load balancing allows changing the energy flow from electric vehicle supply equipment (EVSE) to EV instantaneously to a specific limit.
- Scheduled load balancing supports reactive load balancing and additionally a planning of the energy flow from EVSE to EV with e.g. different power limits and cost indicators over time. It may for example be used to optimize energy distribution in a smart grid.

=== Charging authorization modes ===
For charge authorization, generally two approaches are catered for.

- With "plug and charge", the user plugs in their vehicle and an automated authentication and authorization process is started without any further user interaction. Payment is performed automatically.
- With "external payment", the user has to identify themselves before they can proceed with charging. This step is not part of the CCS protocol; it could involve an RFID card, a payment card or a mobile app.

=== Vehicle coupler ===
CCS Combo connectors

Combo 1

Combo 2

Displayed approximately to scale.

The vehicle coupler is composed of the vehicle connector, which is mounted at the end of a flexible cable, and the vehicle inlet, the counterpart of the connector, which is located within the vehicle. The CCS couplers were based on the Type 1 coupler, the North American standard, and Type 2 coupler, the European standard, as described in IEC 62196-2. One of the challenges of the Combined Charging System was to develop a vehicle inlet which is compatible with both the existing AC vehicle connectors and additional DC contacts. For both Type 1 and Type 2 this has been accomplished by extending the inlet with two additional DC contacts below the existing AC and communication contacts. The resulting new configurations are commonly known as Combo 1 and Combo 2.

For the DC vehicle connector, the implementation varies slightly between Combo 1 and Combo 2. In the case of Combo 1 the connector is extended by two DC contacts, while the Type 1 portion of the connector remains the same with the AC contacts (L1 & N) being unused. For Combo 2 the AC contacts (L1, L2, L3 & N) are completely removed from the connector and therefore the Type 2 portion of the connector has only three contacts remaining – two communication contacts and a protective earth. The vehicle inlet may retain AC contacts to allow non-CCS AC charging.

In both cases, communication and protective earth functions are covered by the original Type 1 or 2 portion of the connector. The Type 1 and Type 2 connectors are described in IEC 62196‑2, while the Combo 1 and Combo 2 connectors are described in IEC 62196‑3 as Configurations EE and FF.

Mating table for type 1 and combo 1 coupler
		Cable connector	
		Type 1	Combo 1
Vehicle inlet	Type 1	AC charging single phase	✗ Incompatible
Vehicle inlet	Combo 1	AC charging single phase	DC charging

Mating table for type 2 and combo 2 coupler
		Cable connector	
		Type 2	Combo 2
Vehicle inlet	Type 2	AC charging single phase or three phase	✗ Incompatible
Vehicle inlet	Combo 2	AC charging single phase or three phase	DC charging

=== High-power charging ===
As vehicle couplers for DC charging according to IEC 62196-3:2014 Ed.1 allow DC charging only with currents up to 200 A, they do not sufficiently cover the needs of the future charging infrastructure. Consequently, a later edition of the standard supports currents of up to 500 A. Such high currents, however, either require large cable cross-sections, leading to heavy and stiff cables, or require cooling if thinner cables are desired. In addition, contact resistance leads to more heat dissipation. To cope with these technical issues, the standard IEC TS 62196-3-1 describes the requirements for high-power DC couplers including thermal sensing, cooling and silver-plating of contacts. CharIN are investigating versions over 2 MW for electric trucks, and equipment is being tested.

== Competition for global acceptance ==
The Combined Charging System is primarily driven by European and North American car manufacturers. Type 1 and Combo 1 chargers are primarily found in North and Central America, Korea and Taiwan, while Type 2 and Combo 2 can be found in Europe, South America, South Africa, Arabia, India, Thailand, Singapore, Taiwan, Hong Kong, Oceania and Australia. For DC charging the competing standard GB/T 20234-2015 is used in China, while Japan uses CHAdeMO.

In the European Union, according to Directive 2014/94/EU all high-power DC charging points installed after November 18, 2017, were to be equipped for interoperability purposes at least with Combo 2 connectors. However, this does not prohibit the provision of other charging points using e.g. CHAdeMO or AC Rapid.

Until 2024, the majority of EVs sold in the United States were made by Tesla and did not natively support CCS charging. Tesla used a proprietary connector from the early-2010s through 2022, though newer Tesla cars also support CCS with a separately sold adapter. In November 2022, Tesla renamed its previously proprietary charging connector to the North American Charging Standard (NACS), making the specifications available to other EV manufacturers and allowing it to support the same signalling standard as CCS. ECO Movement data shows Tesla connectors account for about 58% of DC chargers. Out of which CCS1 held a 38% share, while CHAdeMO accounts for 20%.

In 2023, Ford Motor Company, General Motors, and Rivian announced that they would use NACS instead of CCS connectors on all future North American BEV models. Vehicles will initially come with an adapter in 2024, but new models starting from 2025 would be built with native NACS ports. Subsequently, other EV companies signed agreements for native NACS adoption, including Aptera, BMW Group, Fisker, Honda, Hyundai Motor Group, Jaguar, Lucid, Mercedes-Benz, Nissan, Polestar, Subaru, Toyota, and Volvo. Many major charging networks and charging equipment suppliers also announced support for NACS, including EVgo, FLO, ABB E-Mobility, and EverCharge. NACS was subsequently ratified internationally as standard SAE J3400.

This has led to predictions that CCS1 will soon be obsolete, as it is bigger, heavier and more expensive than NACS.

Hilton Worldwide announced an agreement with Tesla to install 20,000 EVSEs across 2,000 of its properties in North America by 2025.

In many other countries no standard is preferred yet, although CharIN recommended advanced Type 2 and Combo 2 in 2018.
