= IEEE 1905 =

Multi-mode network enabler for home networking

IEEE 1905.1 is an IEEE standard which defines a network enabler for home networking supporting both wireless and wireline technologies: IEEE 802.11 (marketed under the Wi-Fi trademark), IEEE 1901 (HomePlug, HD-PLC) power-line networking, IEEE 802.3 Ethernet and Multimedia over Coax (MoCA).

The IEEE P1905.1 working group had its first meeting in December 2010 to begin development of convergence digital home network specifications. Around 30 organizations participated in the group and achieved approval of the draft P1905.1 standard in January 2013 with final approval and publication by IEEE-SA in April 2013.

The IEEE 1905.1 Standard Working Group is sponsored by the IEEE power-line communication standards committee (PLCSC). From about 2013 to 2015, a program called nVoy certified related products. It is not to be confused with the Pogo Mobile and nVoy device of the same name nor various networked devices named Envoy. Vendors (such as Qualcomm and Broadcom) endorsed the certification regime. Consumer-level lists of features and benefits of IEEE 1905 are also the responsibility of nVoy certifiers.

== Description ==
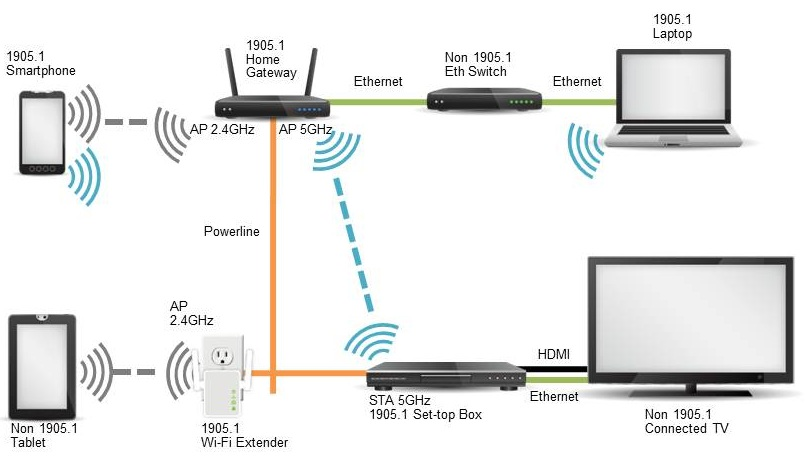
1905.1 home network (does not show AC power line or MoCA connectivity)

The standard includes setup, configuration and operation of home networking devices using heterogeneous technologies. Using multiple interface types (Ethernet, Wi-Fi, Powerline and MoCA) enables better coverage for both mobile and fixed devices.

Standardizing the use of multiple networking technologies to transmit data to a single device in a transparent manner enables powerful use cases in home networks:

- Increase the capacity by load balancing different streams over different links.
- Increase robustness of transmissions by switching streams from one link to another in case of link degradation.
- Better integrate consumer appliances with limited network connectivity (power line only) and high end network devices (typically Ethernet only) into a common network accessible via 802.11ac and .11n for appliance control and media streaming purposes
- Unify device certification under one regime for all major networking protocols (nVoy - see below)
- Generally reduce the number of different devices required and permit storage, processing and user interface functions to migrate to purpose-specific peripherals on a 2 to 5 gigabit networked "bus" or backbone.

=== For service providers and carriers ===
Service providers seek to address growth in network traffic resulting from more devices in more rooms and high-bandwidth latency-straining trends such as IPTV, Video on demand, multi-room DVR and device to device media shifting. 1905.1 upgrades the network to a backbone to improve existing deployments (for instance, ending streaming delays from in-home devices) and enabling new whole-home products and services. Some example features/benefits include:

Self-install
Common setup procedures for adding devices to a network simplifies network setup for consumers; Reduces call volumes and truck rolls.
Advanced diagnostics
Network monitors itself to maintain reliable operation; simplifies troubleshooting
Aggregated throughput
Single devices aggregate throughput from multiple interfaces to ensure sufficient performance and coverage for video applications.
Fallback/failover
Optimizes the hybrid network by opening alternative routes when a link is down or congested which; increases reliability on the customers' network.
Load balancing
Limits network congestion by enabling a hybrid network to intelligently distribute streams over different paths.
Multiple simultaneous streams
Network utilizes multiple media simultaneously enabling multiple streams to exceed the maximum throughput of a single medium. Where dual link aggregation is supported (typically between gigabit Ethernet wired connections), simultaneous streaming can be even faster (e.g. between router- or network-attached storage devices and high-bandwidth displays (such as ultra-high-definition television) making these devices far less troublesome to support in-home.

=== For consumers and retailers ===
Integration of wired and wireless products enables consumers to easily self-install networking equipment capable of significantly improving capacity and coverage in their home network which improves end user satisfaction and reduces product returns. Some specific benefits of 1905.1 networking to the retailer and end user include:

- Ability to upgrade some components of a home network with ensured interoperability with legacy equipment.
- Simplifies network setup and security authentication with consistent password procedures and button push security configuration.
- Increases performance and coverage of home networks which increases the networks capacity to increase overall number of devices in the home.

== Technical overview ==
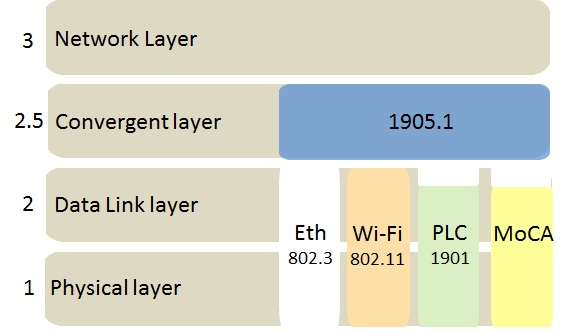
OSI layer model including 1905.1

1905.1 devices run an abstraction layer (AL) hiding the diversity of media access control technologies. This sub-layer exchanges Control Message Data Unit (CMDU) with 1905.1 neighbors. The CMDUs are communicated directly over Layer 2 of the different supported technologies without the need to have an IP stack. The standard does not require any changes to the specifications of the underlying technologies.

This abstraction layer provides a unique EUI-48 address to identify a 1905.1 device. This unique address is useful to keep a persistent address when multiple interfaces are available and facilitate seamless switching of traffic between interfaces. The standard does not define loop prevention and forwarding protocol. A 1905.1 device is compatible with existing IEEE 802.1 bridging protocols.

The management of a 1905.1 device is simplified by the use of a unified Abstraction Layer Management Entity (ALME) and with the use of a data model accessible with CWMP (Broadband Forum TR-069)

== Architecture ==
1905.1 architecture

The architecture designed for the abstraction layer is based on two 1905.1 service access points accessible to upper layers: a 1905.1 MAC SAP and a 1905.1 ALME SAP.

The ALME is a unique management entity supporting different media dependent management entities and a flow-based forwarding table. A 1905.1 protocol is used between ALMEs to distribute different type of management information such as: topology and link metrics.

1905.1 Control Message Data Unit frame consists of an 8 octets header and a variable length list of type–length–values (TLVs) data elements which is easily extendable for future use.

The generic CMDU frame format has the following structure:

| Message version | Reserved | Message type | Message ID | Fragment ID | Last fragment indicator | Relay indicator | Reserved | List of TLV |
|---|---|---|---|---|---|---|---|---|
| 1 octet | 1 octet | 2 octets | 2 octets | 1 octet | 1 bit | 1 bit | 6 bits | Variable length |

Vendor specific CMDU are supported via message type 0x0004.

Each TLV has the following basic structure:

| Type | Length | Value |
|---|---|---|
| 1 octet | 2 octets | Variable length |

Vendor specific TLV are supported via TLV type 11.

The EtherType value assigned to 1905.1 CMDU is 0x893a.

== Features ==
Some of the features of IEEE 1905.1 are listed below.

=== Topology ===
1905.1 provides a tool to get a global view of the network topology regardless of the technologies running in the home/office network.

The abstraction layer generates different topology messages to build this protocol's topology:

- Discovery (message type 0x0000) to detect direct 1905.1 neighbors
- Notification (message type 0x0001) to inform network devices about a topology change
- Query/response (message type 0x0002 and 0x0003) to get the topology database of another 1905.1 device

The group address used for discovery and notification messages is 01:80:c2:00:00:13.

To detect a non-1905.1 bridge connected between two 1905.1 devices, the abstraction layer also generates a LLDP message with the nearest bridge address (01:80:c2:00:00:0e) that is not propagated by 802.1D bridges.

Topology information collected by a 1905.1 device are stored in a data model accessible remotely via TR-069 protocol.

=== Link metrics ===
The 1905.1 ALME provides a mechanism to obtain a list of metrics for links connecting two 1905.1 devices:

- Packet errors
- Transmitted packets
- MAC throughput capacity (expressed in Mbit/s)
- Link availability (expressed as a proportion of time the link is idle)
- PHY rate

A 1905.1 device can also request Link Metrics from another 1905.1 device by generating a Link Metric Query message (Message type 0x0005). The requested device will respond with a Link Metric Response message (Message type 0x0006).

=== Forwarding rules ===
The 1905 ALME provides a list of primitives to manage forwarding rules per flow (Get, Set, Modify and Remove). This feature may be used to distribute dynamically the different flows over the different technologies. To classify the flows, a set or subset of the following elements can be used:

- MAC destination address
- MAC source address
- Ethertype
- VLAN id.
- Priority code point

When setting a forwarding rule for a unicast destination, only one outgoing interface may be specified.

=== Security setup ===
The goal of 1905.1 security setup is to allow a new 1905.1 device to join the network with a unified security procedure even if the device has multiple interfaces running different encryption methods. Three unified security setup procedures are defined:

- 1905.1 Push Button
- 1905.1 User Configured Passphrase/Key (optional)
- 1905.1 Near Field Communication Network Key (optional)

The push button method requires the user to press one button on a new (i.e. not in-network) 1905.1 device and one button on any 1905.1 device already in the network. It is not necessary for the user to know which technology is used by the new device to join the network, and which device will process the pairing and admission of this new device into the network. Two 1905.1 messages are used for the push button method:

- Push Button Event Notification (message type 0x000B)
- Push Button Join Notification (message type 0x000C)

These messages are sent to all 1905.1 devices in the network.

If the user configured passphrase/key is used, the user needs to type/remember only one sequence of US-ASCII characters (between 8 and 63) and the ALME will derive different security passwords for the different technologies through SHA-256 function.

If the NFC network key is used, the user needs to touch the new 1905.1 device with an NFC equipped smartphone already member of the 1905.1 network.

=== AP auto-configuration ===
This feature is used to exchange Wi-Fi Simple Configuration messages over an authenticated 1905.1 link. Using this protocol a 1905.1 AP enrollee can retrieve configuration parameters (like SSID) from a 1905.1 AP registrar. Thus AP auto-configuration is used to simplify the setup of a home network consisting of multiple APs; eliminating the need for the user to manually configure each AP (only a single configuration, of the AP registrar, is required).

A specific 1905.1 CMDU frame (message type 0x0009) is used to transport WPS messages. If an AP enrollee is dual-band (2.4 GHz and 5 GHz) capable, the auto-configuration procedure may be executed twice.

== Implementation ==
Qualcomm Atheros products implementing 1905.1 are named Hy-Fi (for Hybrid Fidelity).

In January 2012, HomePlug Powerline Alliance announced support for IEEE 1905.1 certification.

The consumer certification program named nVoy was announced in June 2013 and first certified chips that "support the new nVoy HomePlug Certification for IEEE 1905.1 compliance" were announced at that time. Consumer-level products were expected by year-end 2013. but were delayed until 2014 consumer shows. As of December 2013 there were no nVoy-certified consumer products; small-network-focused review sites had no products to review.

=== Chipsets ===
Broadcom BCM60500 and BCM60333 SoC are claimed (by the vendor) to be nVoy/1905-compliant. Compatible line drivers were available; e.g. from Microsemi. Qualcomm Atheros offers a variety of Hy-Fi reference designs based on various combinations of Qualcomm VIVE™ 11ac and Qualcomm XSPAN™ 11n wireless LAN, Qualcomm AMP™ power line and Ethernet technologies. MStar Semiconductor indicated its support of nVoy/1905 in its Homeplug AV power line communication solutions.
