= HomePlug =

Power line communications specifications

HomePlug is the family name for various power line communications specifications under the HomePlug designation, each with unique capabilities and compatibility with other HomePlug specifications.

Some HomePlug specifications target broadband applications. For instance in-home distribution of low data rate IPTV, gaming, and Internet content, while others focus on low power, low throughput and extended operating temperatures for applications such as smart power meters and in-home communications between electric systems and appliances. All of the HomePlug specifications were developed by the HomePlug Powerline Alliance, which also owns the HomePlug trademark.

On 18 October 2016 the HomePlug Alliance announced that all of its specifications would be put into the public domain and that other organizations would be taking on future activities relating to deployment of the existing technologies. There was no mention in the announcement of any further technology development within the HomePlug community.

== HomePlug Powerline Alliance ==
HomePlug
- Formation: 2000
- Type: Trade association
- Purpose: Promotion of HomePlug
- Website: homeplug.org at the Wayback Machine (archived 2012-03-17)

The HomePlug Powerline Alliance is a trade association of electronics manufacturers, service providers, and retailers that establishes standards for, and tests members' devices for compliance to, the various HomePlug power line communication technologies. The alliance tests for interoperability and certifies products based on HomePlug specifications and IEEE 1901 standards.

On 18 October 2016, the HomePlug Alliance announced that all of its specifications would be put into the public domain and that other organizations would be taking on future activities relating to deployment of the existing technologies. There was no mention in the announcement of any further technology development within the HomePlug community. Homeplug is essentially defunct as of at least June 2022

== History ==
The HomePlug Powerline Alliance was formed to develop standards and technology for enabling devices to communicate with each other and the Internet over existing structure/house electrical wiring.

One of the greatest technical challenges was finding a way to reduce sensitivity to the electrical noise present on power lines. HomePlug solved this problem by increasing the communication carrier frequencies so that the signal is conveyed by the neutral conductor which is common to all phases.

Founded in 2000, the HomePlug Powerline Alliance's goal was to create a standard to use existing home electrical wiring to communicate between products and connect to the Internet. The first HomePlug specification HomePlug 1.0 was released in June 2001. The HomePlug AV (for audio-video) specification released in 2005 increased physical layer (PHY) peak data rates from approximately 13.0 Mbit/s to 200 Mbit/s.

The HomePlug Green PHY specification was released in June 2010 and targets Smart Energy and Smart Grid applications as an interoperable "sibling" to HomePlug AV with lower cost, lower power consumption and decreased throughput. It approved and published the HomePlug Command and Control specification in 2007 and the HomePlug Green PHY specification in June 2010.

The 2010 IEEE 1901 was approved and HomePlug AV as baseline technology for the FFT-OFDM PHY within the standard and became an international standard. The HomePlug Powerline Alliance is a certifying body for IEEE 1901 products. The three major specifications published by HomePlug (HomePlug AV, HomePlug Green PHY and HomePlug AV2) are interoperable and compliant.

The organization had 69 members and had certified over 200 products as of 2010.

In 2011, the HomePlug Green PHY specification was adopted by Ford, General Motors, Audi, BMW, Daimler, Porsche, and Volkswagen, as a connectivity standard for Plug-In Electrical Vehicle.

As of 2017, there are at least six chip vendors shipping HomePlug AV chipsets with IEEE 1901 specification support: Broadcom, Qualcomm Atheros, Sigma Designs, Intellon, SPiDCOM, and MStar.

Newer versions of HomePlug support the use of Ethernet in bus topology via OFDM modulation, which enables several distinct data carriers to coexist in the same wire. Also, HomePlug's OFDM technology can turn off (mask) any sub-carriers that overlap previously allocated radio spectrum in a given geographic region, thus preventing interference. In North America, for instance, HomePlug AV only uses 917 of 1155 sub-carriers.

== Usage ==
Powerline networking is a network that can be set up using a building's existing electrical wiring.

As of late 2012, the most widely deployed HomePlug devices are "adapters", which are standalone modules that plug into wall outlets (or power strips [but not surge protectors] or extension cords) and provide one or more Ethernet ports. In a simple home network, the Internet gateway router connects via Ethernet cable to a powerline adapter, which in turn plugs into a nearby power outlet. A second adapter, plugged into any other outlet in the home, connects via Ethernet cable to any Ethernet device (e.g., computer, printer, IP phone, gaming station). Communications between the router and Ethernet devices are then conveyed over existing home electrical wiring. More complex networks can be implemented by plugging in additional adapters as needed. A powerline adapter may also be plugged into a hub or switch so that it supports multiple Ethernet devices residing in a common room.

Increasingly, the functionality found in standalone adapters is being built into end devices such as power control centers, digital media adapters, and Internet security cameras. It is anticipated that powerline networking functionality will be embedded in TVs, set-top boxes, DVRs, and other consumer electronics, especially with the emergence of global powerline networking standards such as the IEEE 1901 standard, ratified in September 2010.

For electric vehicle charging, the SAE J1772 standard plug-in electric vehicle charger requires § HomePlug Green PHY to establish communications over the control pilot circuit before the vehicle can begin to draw any charging power. HomePlug GreenPHY is the communication protocol used in the international electric vehicle charging standard CCS.

All commercial HomePlug implementations meet the AES-128 encryption standard specified for advanced metering infrastructure by the US FERC. Accordingly, these devices are suitable to deploy as utility grade meters off the shelf with appropriate software.

== Versions ==
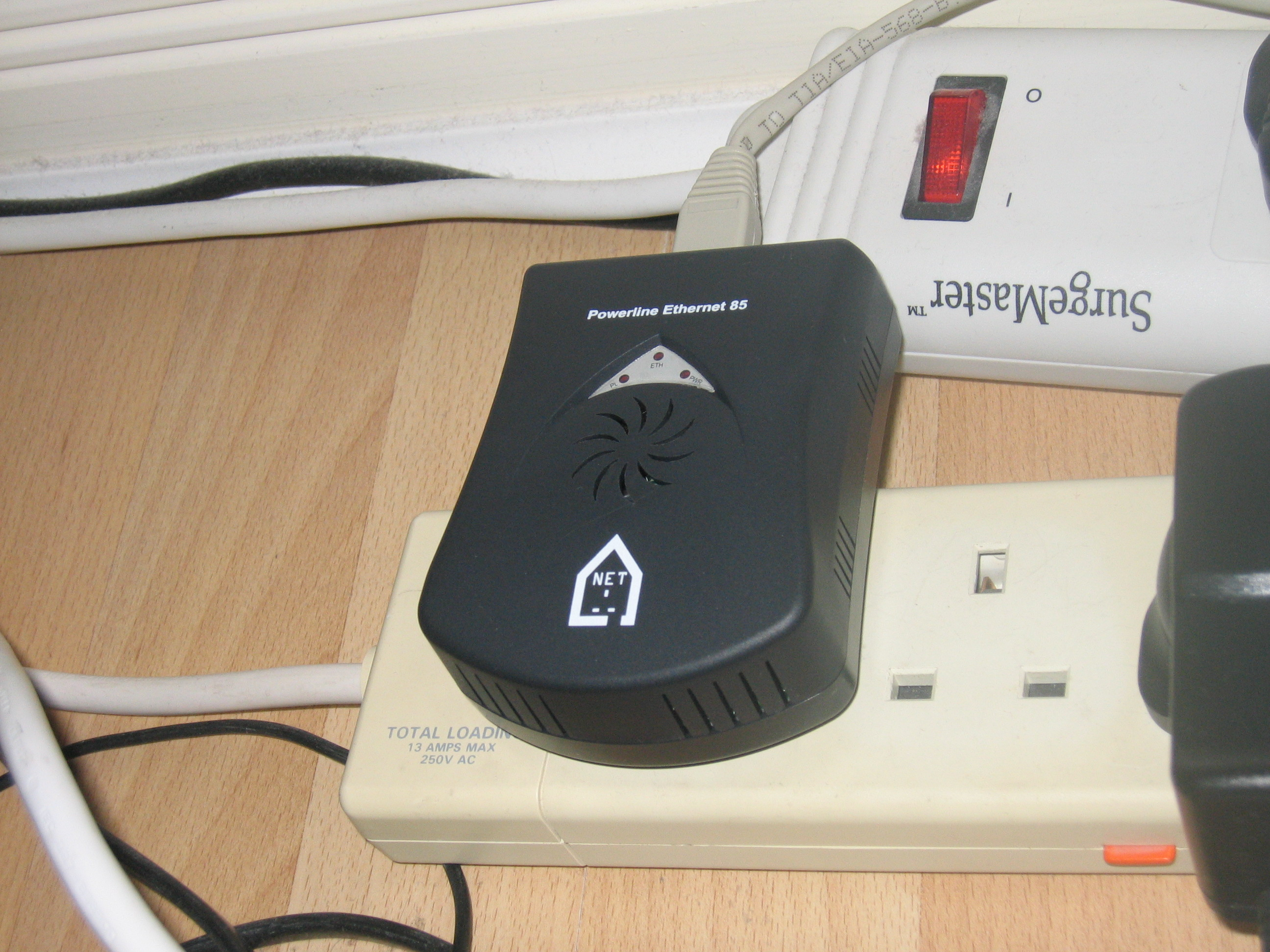
HomePlug 85 Mbit/s adapter

=== HomePlug 1.0 ===
The first HomePlug specification, HomePlug 1.0, provides a peak PHY-rate of 14 Mbit/s. It was first introduced in June, 2001 and has since been replaced by HomePlug AV. On May 28, 2008 Telecommunications Industry Association (TIA) incorporated HomePlug 1.0 powerline technology into the newly published TIA-1113 international standard.

The HomePlug 1.0 MAC Layer uses channel access based on Carrier Sense Multiple Access with Collision Avoidance (CSMA/CA) to transport data from 46 to 1500 bytes long from encapsulated IEEE 802.3 frames as MAC Service Data Units (MSDUs).

HomePlug 1.0 Turbo adapters comply with the HomePlug 1.0 specification but employ a faster, proprietary mode that increases the peak PHY-rate to 85 Mbit/s. HomePlug 1.0 Turbo modems were only available from Intellon Corporation.

=== HomePlug AV ===
The HomePlug AV specification, which was introduced in August 2005, provides sufficient bandwidth for applications such as HDTV and VoIP. HomePlug AV offers a peak data rate of 200 Mbit/s at the physical layer, and about 80 Mbit/s at the MAC layer. HomePlug AV devices are required to coexist, and optionally to interoperate, with HomePlug 1.0 devices. The physical layer uses OFDM carriers spaced at 24.414 kHz, with carriers from 2 to 30 MHz. Depending on the signal to noise ratio, the system automatically selects from BPSK, QPSK, 16 QAM, 64 QAM, 256 QAM, and 1024 QAM, on a carrier by carrier basis.

Utilizing adaptive modulation on up to 1155 OFDM sub-carriers, turbo convolution codes for error correction, two-level MAC framing with ARQ, and other techniques, HomePlug AV can achieve near the theoretical maximum bandwidth across a given transmission path. For security reasons, the specification includes key distribution techniques and the use of 128 bit AES encryption. Furthermore, the specification's adaptive techniques present inherent obstacles to eavesdropping and cyber attacks.

Some Qualcomm Atheros-based adapters comply with the HomePlug AV specification but employ a proprietary extension that increases the PHY-rate to 500 Mbit/s primarily by using a wider spectrum.

=== HomePlug AV2 ===
The HomePlug AV2 specification was introduced in January 2012. It is interoperable with HomePlug AV and HomePlug GreenPHY devices and is IEEE 1901 standard compliant. It features gigabit-class PHY-rate, support for MIMO PHY, repeating functionalities and power saving modes.

=== HomePlug Green PHY ===
The HomePlug Green PHY specification is a subset of HomePlug AV that is intended for use in the smart grid. It has peak rates of 10 Mbit/s and is designed to go into smart meters and smaller appliances such as HVAC thermostats, home appliances and plug-in electric vehicles so that data can be shared over a home network and with the power utility. High capacity broadband is not needed for such applications; the most important requirements are low power and cost, reliable communication, and compact size. GreenPHY uses up to 75% less energy than AV.

HomePlug Green PHY devices are required to be fully interoperable with devices based on HomePlug AV, HomePlug AV2 and IEEE 1901 specification.

=== HomePlug Access BPL ===
Access Broadband Power Line (BPL) refers to a to-the-home broadband access technology. The HomePlug Alliance formed the HomePlug Access BPL Working Group, whose first charter was to develop the Market Requirements Document (MRD) for a HomePlug Access BPL specification. The Alliance made an open invitation to the BPL industry to participate in the development of or provide input for consideration in the MRD. After several months of collaboration between utilities, ISPs and other BPL industry groups, the MRD was completed in June 2005. HomePlug's work on the Access BPL was subsequently contributed and merged into the IEEE 1901 standard.

== Security ==
Since signals may travel outside the user's residence or business and be eavesdropped on, HomePlug includes the ability to set an encryption password. The HomePlug specification requires that all devices are set to a default out-of-box password – although a common one. Users should change this password. If the password is not changed, an attacker can use their own homeplug device to detect the users signals, and then use the default password to access and change settings such as the encryption key used.

On many new powerline adapters that come as a boxed pair, a unique security key has already been established and the user does not need to change the password, except when using these with existing powerline adapters, or adding new adapters to an existing network. Some systems support an authenticate button, allowing adapters to be added to the network with just two button presses (one on each of the devices).

To simplify the process of configuring passwords on a HomePlug network, each device has a built-in master password, chosen at random by the manufacturer and hard-wired into the device, which is used only for setting the encryption passwords. A printed label on the device lists its master password.

The HomePlug AV standard uses 128-bit AES, while the older versions use the less secure DES protocols.

Since HomePlug devices typically function as transparent network bridges, computers running any operating system can use them for network access. However, some manufacturers only supply the password-setup software in a Microsoft Windows version; in other words, enabling encryption requires a computer running Windows. Once the encryption password has been configured, any device supporting the Ethernet specification will work on the adapter.

== Interoperability ==
HomePlug AV, GP and AV2 are fully interoperable, and will also interoperate with IEEE 1901 devices. HomePlug 1.0 devices do not interoperate with HomePlug AV devices. Although it is technically possible to achieve such backward compatibility, doing so is not economically feasible because of the high cost of circuitry that would have to support different forward error correction (FEC) techniques and feature sets.

HomePlug devices will not interoperate with devices that employ other powerline technologies, such as Universal Powerline Association (UPA), HD-PLC, or G.hn. In the case of G.hn, it was deemed prohibitively expensive to implement both HomePlug's turbo coding forward error correction and G.hn's low-density parity-check code. However, IEEE 1901 allows co-existence within the same deployment of both HomePlug AV and HD-PLC via its Inter-System Protocol (ISP). G.hn also supports the ISP.

HomePlug devices are not compatible with certain power strips, surge protectors, and uninterruptible power supplies incorporating filters, which block the high-frequency signal. In such cases, the installer must plug devices directly into building electrical receptacles. If a spare power point is not available, a double adapter can be used in many cases with the incompatible device on one side and the HomePlug device on the other.

== EMI concerns ==
In the UK there have been suggestions in media that users of powerline equipment may be prosecuted under the Wireless Telegraphy Act, if they cause interference to official radio systems. GCHQ has published concerns that such interference affects its ability to monitor radio activity in the UK; this was later retracted and GCHQ stated that power line networking equipment doesn't affect its activities.

== See also ==
- Multimedia over Coax Alliance
- Power over Ethernet
- IEEE 1901
- HD-PLC
