= Power-over-fiber =

Fiber-optic-cable technology

Power-over-fiber (PoF) is a technology in which a fiber-optic cable carries optical power, which is used as an energy source rather than, or as well as, carrying data. This allows a device to be remotely powered, while providing electrical isolation between the device and the power supply. Such systems can be used to protect the power supply from dangerous voltages, such as from lightning, or to prevent voltage from the supply from igniting explosives. Power over fiber may also be useful in applications or environments where it is important to avoid the electromagnetic fields created by electricity flowing through copper wire, such as around delicate sensors or in sensitive military applications.

== See also ==
- Phantom power
- Power over Ethernet (PoE)
