= IEEE 1901 =

IEEE standard for broadband over power lines

IEEE 1901 is a standard for high-speed (up to 500 Mbit/s at the physical layer) communication devices via electric power lines, often called broadband over power lines (BPL). The standard uses transmission frequencies below 100 MHz. This standard is usable by all classes of BPL devices, including BPL devices used for the connection (<1500m to the premises) to Internet access services as well as BPL devices used within buildings for local area networks, smart energy applications, transportation platforms (vehicle), and other data distribution applications (<100m between devices).

The IEEE 1901 Standard, established in 2010, set the first worldwide benchmark for powerline communication tailored for multimedia home networks, audio-video, and the smart grid. This standard underwent an amendment in IEEE 1901a-2019, introducing improvements to the HD-PLC physical layer (wavelet) for Internet of Things (IoT) applications. It was further updated in 2020, known as IEEE 1901-2020.

The IEEE 1901 standard replaced a dozen previous powerline specifications. It includes a mandatory coexistence Inter-System Protocol (ISP). The IEEE 1901 ISP prevents interference when the different BPL implementations are operated within close proximity of one another. To handle multiple devices attempting to use the line at the same time, IEEE 1901 supports TDMA, but CSMA/CA (also used in WiFi) is most commonly implemented by devices sold.

The IEEE 1901 standard is mandatory to initiate SAE J1772 electric vehicle DC charging (AC uses PWM) and the sole powerline protocol for IEEE 1905.1 heterogeneous networking. It was highly recommended in the IEEE P1909.1 smart grid standards because those are primarily for control of AC devices, which by definition always have AC power connections - thus no additional connections are required.

== Updates overview ==
The IEEE 1901 Standard was a significant step in the development of powerline communication (PLC) technologies. PLC allows for data communication over existing power lines, which can be particularly useful in environments where it's difficult to lay new wiring or where wireless communication might be problematic.

1. IEEE 1901-2010: This was the initial standard that set the groundwork for broadband over power lines (BPL) and in-home powerline networks. It defined two incompatible physical layers:
  - FFT (Fast Fourier Transform) based OFDM (Orthogonal Frequency Division Multiplexing): Primarily used for access BPL.
  - Wavelet-based OFDM: Used for in-home networks and some access BPL applications.
2. IEEE 1901a-2019: This amendment focused on enhancing the wavelet-based HD-PLC (High Definition Power Line Communication) physical layer. The main goal was to make it more suitable for Internet of Things (IoT) applications. IoT devices often require low power, low latency, and reliable communication, and the enhancements in this amendment aimed to cater to these needs.
3. IEEE 1901-2020: This was a revision of the original 1901 standard. Revisions in standards typically involve updates to address technological advancements, incorporate feedback from the industry, and ensure that the standard remains relevant and effective. The revision incorporates amendment IEEE 1901a-2019.
4. IEEE 1901b-2021: This amendment added state-of the art authentication and authorization mechanisms to the Medium Access Control (MAC) layer using IEEE Std 802.1X, providing secure, interoperable communication to IEEE 1901 IoT and Smart Grid networks.
5. IEEE 1901c-2024: This amendment specified how to apply IEEE 1901 specifications on any media. The goal was to achieve seamless communication over different media and between different communication channels. New communication channels extended to low-frequency bands were added to the wavelet-based Nessum (New name of HD-PLC High Definition Power Line Communication) physical layer to address long-range and robust communication on these new media. The amendment also specified how to use IEEE Std 1588 precision time protocol (PTP) in IEEE 1901 networks.

The development and evolution of the IEEE 1901 standard underscores the importance of powerline communication in modern networking scenarios. As the IoT continues to grow, with billions of devices getting connected, having a robust and versatile communication medium like PLC can be invaluable, especially in environments where traditional networking methods might be challenging.

== Status ==
The IEEE P1901 Working Group started in June 2005. More than 90 organizations contributed to the standard. Half of the organizations were from US, a quarter from Japan and the last quarter from Europe.

IEEE 1901 completed a formal standard IEEE 1901-2010 published in December 2010. The working group which maintains and extends the standards is sponsored by the IEEE Power Line Communication Standard Committee (PLCSC). IEEE 1901-2020 has been published in January 2021.

=== Adoptions ===
==== ITU-T G.9972 ====
The IEEE 1901 ISP coexistence protocol was extended to support the International Telecommunication Union's family of home networking standards known as G.hn, and adopted by the ITU-T as Recommendation ITU-T G.9972.

==== SGIP ====
The Smart Grid Interoperability Panel (SGIP) initiated by the U.S. National Institute of Standards and Technology (NIST) mandates the implementation of the IEEE 1901 ISP coexistence mechanism (or ITU-T G.9972) in all technologies operating over power lines. NISTIR 7862: Guideline for the Implementation of Coexistence for Broadband Power Line Communication Standards The IEEE 1901 standard is included in the SGIP Catalog of Standards

==== DLNA ====
In 2012 the Digital Living Network Alliance (DLNA) announced it supported IEEE 1901 standards.

==== SAE and IEC 62196 ====
The SAE J1772 and IEC 62196 standards for electric vehicle charging include IEEE 1901 as the standard for power line communication between the vehicle, off-board DC charging station, and the smart grid, without requiring an additional pin; SAE International and the IEEE Standards Association are sharing their draft standards related to the smart grid and vehicle electrification.

==== IEEE 1905.1 ====
IEEE 1901 is the powerline communication standard supported by the IEEE 1905.1 Standard for a Convergent Digital Home Network.

== Description ==
The 1901 standards include two different physical layers (PHY), one based on fast Fourier transform (FFT) orthogonal frequency-division multiplexing (OFDM) modulation and another based on wavelet OFDM modulation. Each PHY is optional, and implementers of the specification may, but are not required to, include both. The FFT PHY is derived from HomePlug AV technology and is deployed in HomePlug-based products. The Wavelet PHY is derived from HD-PLC technology and is deployed in HD-PLC-based products. It goes up to 1024-QAM.

The FFT PHY includes a forward error correction (FEC) scheme based on convolutional turbo code (CTC). The second option "Wavelet PHY" includes a mandatory FEC based on concatenated Reed–Solomon (RS) and convolutional code, and an option to use low-density parity-check (LDPC) code.

On top of these two physical layers, two different media access control (MAC) layers were defined; one for in-home networking and the other for Internet access. Two MACs were needed because each application has different requirements.

To manage coexistence between PHYs and MACs the Inter-System Protocol (ISP) was developed. ISP enables various BPL devices and systems to share communication resources (frequency/time) when installed in a network with common electrical wiring. ISP allows 1901-compliant devices and ITU-T G.hn- compliant devices to co-exist. The protocol provides configurable frequency division for access and time division for in-home with a granularity compatible with the quality of service (QoS) requirements of the most demanding audio and video applications.

An amendment in 2019, IEEE 1901a-2019, defines a more flexible way of separating wavelet OFDM channels for Internet of Things applications.

A second amendment in 2021, IEEE 1901b-2021, adds state-of the art authentication and authorization mechanisms to the Medium Access Control (MAC) layer using IEEE Std 802.1X.

A third amendment in 2024, IEEE 1901c-2024, extends the application of IEEE 1901 to any media and defines new Nessum (Previously HD-PLC) channels to address long-range and robust communication on these new media.

== Related standards ==
Another trade group called the HomeGrid Forum was formed in 2008 to promote the ITU-T home networking standards known as G.hn. Recommendation ITU-T G.9972 approved in June 2010, specifies a coexistence mechanism for home networking transceivers capable of operating over powerline wiring. This recommendation is based on IEEE 1901 ISP.

IEEE 1675 was approved in 2008. It provided testing and verification standards for the hardware commonly used for broadband over power line (BPL) installations (primarily couplers and enclosures) and standard installation methods to ensure compliance with applicable codes and standards.

Other IEEE standards sponsored by the Power line Communication Standards Committee:

- "IEEE P1909.1". Archived from the original on 21 July 2012.: Recommended Practice for Smart Grid Communication Equipment -Test methods and installation requirements
- "IEEE 1905.1". Archived from the original on 15 October 2016.: Standard for a Convergent Digital Home Network for Heterogeneous Technologies.
- "IEEE 1775".: Power Line Communication EMC Working Group.

=== Derived standards ===
The two standards below and their amendments are also written by the same committee. Despite the different bandwidths and frequencies addressed, they are based on similar technologies specialized to their main areas of use. All three include provisions for cryptographic security and authentication.

- IEEE 1901.1: Mid Frequency (less than 12 MHz) Power Line Communications for Smart Grid Applications. It uses either type of OFDM, can use TDMA or CSMA, and modulates up to 16-QAM. It has provisions for ISP.
- IEEE 1901.2: Low Frequency (less than 500 kHz) Narrow Band Power Line Communications for Smart Grid Applications. It was authorized in 2010 and approved as standard by October 2012. It supports data rates of up to 500 kbit/s. It only uses FFT OFDM. It supports CSMA or a frequency-notching collision avoidance (FDMA-like), although analyses tend to believe that the CSMA mechanism will be used less often as it requires a preamble to be sent, while FDMA is naturally supported as a part of adaptive tone (frequency) picking. Compared to the other two standards, it has most parts simplified or minified due to the lower speed and more limited scope of use. It modulates up to 16-QAM, supports up to 72 kV grids, and has provisions for sending data across a transformer. It also describes possibility of interoperability with G3-PLC/PRIME CENELEC A.

An IETF RFC Draft address the higher layers of the protocol, namely the specifics of passing IPv6 packets over the PHY and MAC layers of PLC systems like IEEE 1901. 6LoWPAN was previously used for this purpose, but it does not match the use case exactly.

== See also ==
- Power line communication
- HomePlug
- G.hn
- HomePNA
- Nessum
- Nessum Alliance
