= Nessum =

Communications technology

Nessum, previously HD-PLC (short for 'High Definition Power Line Communication'), is a communication technology standardized by the Institute of Electrical and Electronics Engineers (IEEE). It is standardized as IEEE 1901-2020. The standard is to be used to communicate data over wired and wireless media using high frequencies between ~500kHz and ~56 MHz bands. The Nessum Alliance is the certifying body for compatibility between Nessum-based communication devices.

== Overview ==
Nessum offers two types of communication: wired (Nessum WIRE) and wireless (Nessum AIR).

=== Wired communication ===
Nessum WIRE can be used for various types of wires such as power lines, twisted pair wiring, coaxial cables, and telephone lines. The communication distance can range between tens of meters to several kilometers depending on the use case. In addition, when an automatic relay function called multi-hop (ITU-T G.9905) is utilized, a maximum of 10 stages of relay is possible to extend the range, and support various network topologies (Ring, Star, Bus, MESH). With a maximum physical speed of 1 Gbps and effective throughput ranging from several Mbps to several hundred Mbps, this technology is used to reduce network construction costs and complexity by utilizing the existing lines or dedicated lines.

=== Wireless communication ===
Nessum wireless communication is called Nessum AIR. It uses magnetic field communication for short range communication. The communication distance can be controlled in the range of a few centimeters to 100 centimeters. Maximum physical speed is 1 Gbps, with an effective speed of 100 Mbps.

== Technical overview ==
=== Physical layer (PHY) ===
The physical layer uses Wavelet OFDM (Wavelet Orthogonal Frequency Division Multiplexing), while a guard interval is required in ordinary OFDM systems. The Wavelet OFDM system eliminates the guard interval and increases the occupancy rate of the data portion, thereby achieving high efficiency. In addition, due to the bandwidth limitation of each subcarrier, the level of sidelobes is set low, which facilitates the formation of spectral notches. This minimizes interference with existing systems and allows for flexible compliance with frequency utilization regulations. Furthermore, Pulse-Amplitude Modulation (PAM) is used for each subcarrier, and the optimal number of modulation multi-levels is set according to the conditions of the transmission path, thereby improving transmission efficiency. The frequency band used can be selected from among standardized patterns.

=== Data link layer (MAC) ===
The data link layer manages quality of service and other control functions using control frames "beacons" broadcast periodically by the parent to all terminals in the network. The basic media access methods are Carrier-Sense Multiple Access with Collision Avoidance (CSMA/CA) and Dynamic Virtual Token Passing (DVTP), which dynamically assign transmission rights to terminals in the network and avoid collisions, The system uses a collision avoidance mechanism.

== Specification and features ==
There are essentially two different types of HD-PLC: HD-PLC Complete and HD-PLC Multi-hop. They are incompatible.

=== HD-PLC Complete ===
This is for high speed applications such as TV, AV, and surveillance cameras.

The major technical features include:

- IEEE 1901 full compliant
- QoS by the priority control
- CSMA/CA and DVTP(Dynamic Virtual Token Passing) supported
- Concurrent multi-AV stream, VoIP, and file transfer and file transfer supported using IP packet classification
- Multi-network access at priority CSMA/CA with network synchronization

=== HD-PLC Multi-hop ===
This is for long-distance applications such as smart meter, building network, factory, energy management, and IoT devices.

The major technical features include:

- ITU-T G.9905 multihop technology

=== Common features ===
- Uplinking/downlinking through 432 of 26 MHz (between 1.8 MHz and 28 MHz) bandwidth subcarriers with Wavelet OFDM
- Maximum 240 Mbit/s PHY rate
- Multilevel modulation for each subcarrier which suits the properties of the power line transmission channel and allows for the best transmission speed
- Subcarrier masking with the arbitrary number which can comply with the rules in each country
- Forward error correction (FEC) which enables effective frame transmission
- Channel estimation launch system with change detector for cycle and transmission channel
- HD-PLC network bridging compatible to Ethernet address system
- Advanced encryption with 128 bit AES

=== 4th-generation HD-PLC (HD-PLC Quatro Core technology) ===
We now come to communication speed issues like high-definition video images (4K/8K) or in some cases multi hop technology is not enough to reach an isolated and distant PLC terminal. HD-PLC Quatro Core has been designed to solve these problems. This technology is an improvement on the conventional HD-PLC in both communication distance and speed. It achieves to double conventional HD-PLC's communication distance by adopting a communication band of 1/2 or 1/4 of conventional HD-PLC band and achieves to offer a maximum physical line transmission rate of 1 Gbit/s by using an expanded communication band 2 or 4 times the conventional HD-PLC band.

This evolution of the standard therefore offers either an extended range in a larger building, at the cost of a lower data rate, or a higher data rate, but achievable over shorter distances than in the previous version of the standard.

== Use cases ==
There are a few strengths of using HD-PLC technology on existing wires.

- Expectable higher speed performance
- Cost reduction on network construction by existed infrastructure
- Support the area where the radio waves is difficult to be reached
- Wire saving by sharing power lines and communication lines

Typical use case include:

- HVAC systems
- Building Automation
- Photovoltaic (solar) panel communications
- Smart metering
- Meter to grid communications
- Smart street lighting
- Surveillance camera systems
- Video entry systems
- Communications in tunnels
- Robot wiring optimisation

== Nessum Alliance ==
Nessum Alliance was established in September 2007 as a voluntary association, originally under the name of "HD-PLC Alliance". In October 2023, the HD-PLC Alliance was renamed the Nessum Alliance.

Nessum Alliance is a certifying body for compatibility between communication devices that comply with the international standard IEEE 1901-2020. Associated organisations are the Japanese Telecommunication Technology Committee (TTC) The Taiwanese Industrial Technology Research Institute and the IEEE Standards Association.

At the outset of Q2 2025 the Nessum Alliance listed 41 member companies and organisations.

== History ==
This technology is based on HD-PLC, a type of power line communication developed by Panasonic in the early 2000s. HD-PLC was developed for room-to-room transmission of audio and video data at the time, but later began to be used not only for power lines but also for coaxial lines and twisted pair lines, and even for wireless communication. The name "power line communication" did not match the reality of the situation. In September 2023, Panasonic Holdings Corporation changed the name of HD-PLC to Nessum.

== See also ==
- BACnet
- Power line communication
- HomePlug
- G.hn
- HomePNA
- IEEE 1901
- KNX
- LonWorks
