= G.9963 =

ITU-T home networking recommendations
Common name	Recommendations
HomePNA 2.0	G.9951, G.9952, G.9953
HomePNA 3.0	G.9954 (02/05)
HomePNA 3.1	G.9954 (01/07)
G.hn	G.9960, G.9961
G.hn-management	G.9962
G.hn-mimo	G.9963
G.hn-psd	G.9964
G.vlc	G.9991
G.cx	G.9972
G.hnta	G.9970
G.dpm	G.9977
G.sa	G.9978
G.cwmp (TR-069)	G.9980

Recommendation G.9963 is a home networking standard under development at the International Telecommunication Union standards sector, the ITU-T.

It was begun in 2010 by ITU-T to add multiple-input and multiple-output (known as MIMO) capabilities to the G.hn standard originally defined in Recommendation G.9960. The standard is also known as "G.hn-mimo".

As part of the family of G.hn standards, G.9963 was endorsed by the HomeGrid Forum.
