= Home server =

Computing server located in a private residence

A home server is a computing server located in a private residence providing services to other devices inside or outside the household through a home network or the Internet. Such services may include file and printer serving, media center serving, home automation control, web serving (on the network or Internet), web caching, file sharing and synchronization, video surveillance and digital video recorder, calendar and contact sharing and synchronization, account authentication, and backup services.

Because of the relatively low number of computers on a typical home network, a home server commonly does not require significant computing power. Home servers can be implemented do-it-yourself style with a re-purposed, older computer, or a plug computer; pre-configured commercial home server appliances are also available. An uninterruptible power supply is sometimes used in case of power outages that can possibly corrupt data.

== Services provided by home servers ==
=== Administration and configuration ===
Home servers often run headless, and can be administered remotely through a command shell, or graphically through a remote desktop system such as RDP, VNC, Webmin, Apple Remote Desktop, or many others.

Some home server operating systems (such as Windows Home Server) include a consumer-focused graphical user interface (GUI) for setup and configuration that is available on home computers on the home network (and remotely over the Internet via remote access). Others simply enable users to use native operating system tools for configuration.

=== Centralized storage ===
Home servers often act as network-attached storage (NAS) providing the major benefit that all users' files can be centrally and securely stored, with flexible permissions applied to them. Such files can be easily accessed from any other system on the network, provided the correct credentials are supplied. This also applies to shared printers.

Such files can also be shared over the Internet to be accessible from anywhere in the world using remote access.

Servers running Unix or Linux with the free Samba suite (or certain Windows Server products - Windows Home Server excluded) can provide domain control, custom logon scripts, and roaming profiles to users of certain versions of Windows. This allows a user to log on from any machine in the domain and have access to their "Documents" folder and personalized Windows and application preferences - multiple accounts on each computer in the home are not needed.

=== Media serving ===
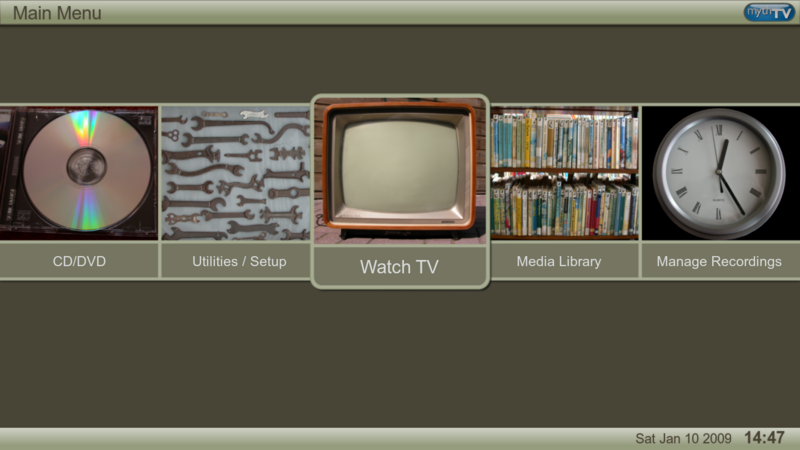
A typical MythTV menu

Home servers are often used to serve multi-media content, including photos, music, and video to other devices in the household (and even to the Internet; see Space shifting, Tonido and Orb). Using standard protocols such as DLNA or proprietary systems such as iTunes, users can access their media stored on the home server from any room in the house. Windows XP Media Center Edition, Windows Vista, and Windows 7 can act as a home server, supporting a particular type of media serving that streams the interactive user experience to Media Center Extenders including the Xbox 360.

Windows Home Server supports media streaming to Xbox 360 and other DLNA-based media receivers via the built-in Windows Media Connect technology. Some Windows Home Server device manufacturers, such as HP, extend this functionality with a full DLNA implementation such as PacketVideo TwonkyMedia server.

There are many open-source and fully functional programs for media serving available for Linux. LinuxMCE is one example, which allows other devices to boot off a hard drive image on the server, allowing them to become appliances such as set-top boxes. Asterisk, Xine, MythTV (another media serving solution), VideoLAN, SlimServer, DLNA, and many other open-source projects are fully integrated for a seamless home theater/automation/telephony experience.

On an Apple Macintosh server, options include iTunes, PS3 Media Server, and Elgato. Additionally, for Macs directly connected to TVs, Boxee can act as a full-featured media center interface.

Servers are typically always on so the addition of a TV or radio tuner allows recording to be scheduled at any time.

Services such as Windows Home Server are less used, likely due to modern services such as Plex and Jellyfin. These services allow users to store their media on a NAS and stream and sometimes download it to devices within the network and optionally to devices outside the network. These services automatically sort users media and find metadata and sometimes subtitles. They also track and remember users progress within a movie or series so they can continue from where they left off.

These services have been criticised for catering to pirates by allowing them to easily manage and view their illegally obtained media.

=== Remote access ===
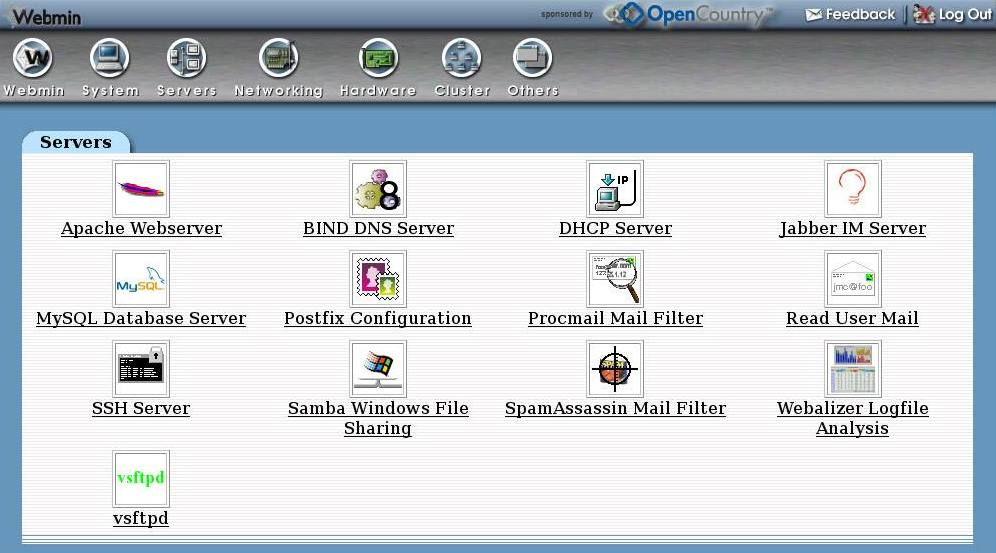
The Webmin Interface as it would appear in a standard web browser

A home server can be used to provide remote access into the home from devices on the Internet, using remote desktop software and other remote administration software. For example, Windows Home Server provides remote access to files stored on the home server via a web interface as well as remote access to Remote Desktop sessions on PCs in the house. Similarly, Tonido provides direct access via a web browser from the Internet without requiring any port forwarding or other setup. Some enthusiasts often use VPN technologies as well.

Two services common on Linux home servers are VNC and Webmin. VNC allows clients to remotely view a server GUI desktop as if the user was physically sitting in front of the server. A GUI need not be running on the server console for this to occur; there can be multiple 'virtual' desktop environments open at the same time. Webmin allows users to control many aspects of server configuration and maintenance all from a simple web interface. Both can be configured to be accessed from anywhere on the Internet.

Servers can also be accessed remotely using the command line-based Telnet and SSH protocols.

=== Web serving ===
Some users choose to run a web server in order to share files easily and publicly (or privately, on the home network). Others set up web pages and serve them straight from their home, although this may be in violation of some ISPs terms of service. Sometimes these web servers are run on a nonstandard port in order to avoid the ISP's port blocking. Example web servers used on home servers include Apache and IIS.

==== Web proxy ====
Some networks have an HTTP proxy which can be used to speed up web access when multiple users visit the same websites, and to get past blocking software while the owner is using the network of some institution that might block certain sites. Public proxies are often slow and unreliable and so it is worth the trouble of setting up one's own private proxy.

Some proxies can be configured to block websites on the local network if it is set up as a transparent proxy.

=== E-mail ===
Many home servers also run e-mail servers that handle e-mail for the owner's domain name. The advantages are having much bigger mailboxes and maximum message size than most commercial e-mail services. Access to the server, since it is on the local network is much faster than using an external service. This also increases security as e-mails do not reside on an off-site server.

=== BitTorrent ===
Home servers are ideal for utilizing the BitTorrent protocol for downloading and seeding files as some torrents can take days, or even weeks to complete and perform better on an uninterrupted connection. There are many text based clients such as rTorrent and web-based ones such as TorrentFlux and Tonido available for this purpose. BitTorrent also makes it easier for those with limited bandwidth to distribute large files over the Internet.

=== Gopher ===
An unusual service is the Gopher protocol, a hypertext document retrieval protocol which pre-dated the World Wide Web and was popular in the early 1990s. Many of the remaining gopher servers are run off home servers utilizing PyGopherd and the Bucktooth gopher server.

=== Home automation ===
Home automation frequently relies on continuously operational devices for effective control and management. While traditional home servers have been instrumental in this area, the emergence and increasing use of Raspberry Pi and other Single Board Computers (SBCs) have become prominent. These devices, notably the Raspberry Pi, offer a flexible platform for running home automation software such as Gladys and Home Assistant. This shift towards SBC-based solutions has made home automation more accessible and cost-efficient, allowing a broader range of users to seamlessly control and integrate various smart home devices, thereby enhancing the overall functionality and convenience of their home automation systems.

=== Security monitoring ===
Relatively low cost CCTV DVR solutions are available that allow recording of video cameras to a home server for security purposes. The video can then be viewed on PCs or other devices in the house.

A series of cheap USB-based webcams can be connected to a home server as a makeshift CCTV system. Optionally these images and video streams can be made available over the Internet using standard protocols.

=== Family applications ===
Home servers can act as a host to family-oriented applications such as a family calendar, to-do lists, and message boards.

=== IRC and instant messaging ===
Because a server is always on, an IRC client or IM client running on it will be highly available to the Internet. This way, the chat client will be able to record activity that occurs even while the user is not at the computer, e.g. asleep or at work or school. Textual clients such as Irssi and tmsnc can be detached using GNU Screen for example, and graphical clients such as Pidgin can be detached using xmove. Quassel provides a specific version for this kind of use. Home servers can also be used to run personal XMPP servers and IRC servers as these protocols can support a large number of users on very little bandwidth.

=== Online gaming ===
Some multiplayer games such as Continuum, Tremulous, Minecraft, and Doom have server software available which users may download and use to run their own private game server. Some of these servers are password protected, so only a selected group of people such as clan members or whitelisted players can gain access to the server. Others are open for public use and may move to colocation or other forms of paid hosting if they gain a large number of players.

=== Federated social networks ===
Home servers can be used to host distributed federated social networks like Diaspora and GNU Social. Federation protocols like ActivityPub allow many small home servers to interact in a meaningful way and give the perception of being on a large traditional social network. Federation is not just limited to social networks. Many innovative new free software web services are being developed that can allow people to host their own videos, photos, blogs etc. and still participate in the larger federated networks.

=== Third-party platform ===
Home servers often are platforms that enable third-party products to be built and added over time. For example, Windows Home Server provides a Software Development Kit. Similarly, Tonido provides an application platform that can be extended by writing new applications using their SDK.

== Operating systems ==
Home servers run many different operating systems. Enthusiasts who build their own home servers can use whatever OS is conveniently available or familiar to them, such as Linux, Microsoft Windows, BSD, Solaris or Plan 9 from Bell Labs.

Home servers have evolved quite a bit in recent years and there is a thriving community out there that self-host their software, which is called selfhosting. Selfhosting can be a bit of a challenge, so some have taken it upon themselves to make it simpler for more people.

== Software ==
There are hundreds to thousands of applications out there that can easily be run on a home server as containers. Awesome Selfhosted provides a curated list of these applications that can usually be installed via containers with a few simple commands, where updates, dependencies, and installation are managed automatically.

Alternatively, home server admins can install most of the operating systems above and get a marketplace / app store to make installing apps even more convenient.

== Hardware ==
Single-board computers are increasingly being used to power home servers, with many of them being ARM devices. Old desktop and laptop computers can also be re-purposed to be used as home servers.

Mobile phones are typically just as powerful as ARM-based single board computers. Once mobile phones can run the Linux operating system, self-hosting might move to mobile devices with each person's data and services being served from their own mobile phone.

Specialized hardware is also becoming fairly common when it comes to self-hosting. Some hardware comes in the form of a Network Attached Storage device, while others are custom designed by the company for use in the home.

=== Popular Self-Hosting Hardware ===
- Umbrel Home
- ASUSTOR
- Raspberry Pi

== See also ==
=== Server definitions ===
- Server (computing)
  - Network-attached storage (NAS)
  - File server
  - Print server
  - Media server

=== Operating systems ===
- BSD UNIX
- Hypervisor illumos distributions
- Various Linux distributions
- macOS Server
- Solaris
- Windows Home Server
- Windows Server Essentials
- Plan 9 from Bell Labs - The successor to Unix

=== Products ===
- HP MediaSmart Server

=== Technologies ===
- Client–server model
- Dynamic DNS
- Home network
- Residential gateway

=== Media serving software ===
- Front Row - for Mac OS X
- LinuxMCE
- MythTV
- Plex Media Server
- Kodi
- Jellyfin

=== Server software ===
- Comparison of web servers
- List of mail server software
- Samba (software)
- RealVNC
- Tonido

=== Home networking ===
- DOCSIS
- G.hn
- HomePNA
- Power line communication, HomePlug Powerline Alliance
- VDSL, VDSL2
- Wireless LAN, IEEE 802.11
