= Lantiq =

German fabless semiconductor company

- Type: Subsidiary
- Industry: Microcontrollers, communication, Semiconductors
- Founded: 2009
- Defunct: 2015
- Fate: Acquired by Intel in 2015, its division responsible for Lantiq's products sold to MaxLinear in 2020.
- Headquarters: Neubiberg, Bavaria, Germany
- Products: Integrated circuits
- Number of employees: 1,000
- Parent: Intel

Lantiq was a Germany-based fabless semiconductor company of approximately 1,000 people formed via a spin-out from Infineon Technologies. The company was purchased in 2015 by Intel for $345M.

== Corporate history ==
Lantiq was created on July 7, 2009 when Infineon Technologies announced that it agreed to sell its wire-based communications division to Golden Gate Capital, resulting in a new stand-alone name of Lantiq. This was one of several steps to raise cash during the Great Recession. Some technology had been acquired when Infineon purchased Taiwan-based ADMTek (partially owned by Accton Technology Corporation) for approximately US$100 million in cash in 2004.

Some assets and patents acquired from Massachusetts-based Aware Inc for about US$6.75 million were included in the spinoff. The division was headed by Christian Wolff when the deal closed on 6 November 2009 for about 243 million Euros.

Lantiq's central functions and the executive management team were located in Neubiberg, near Munich Germany.

In May 2012, Dan Artusi from Conexant replaced Wolff as chief executive.

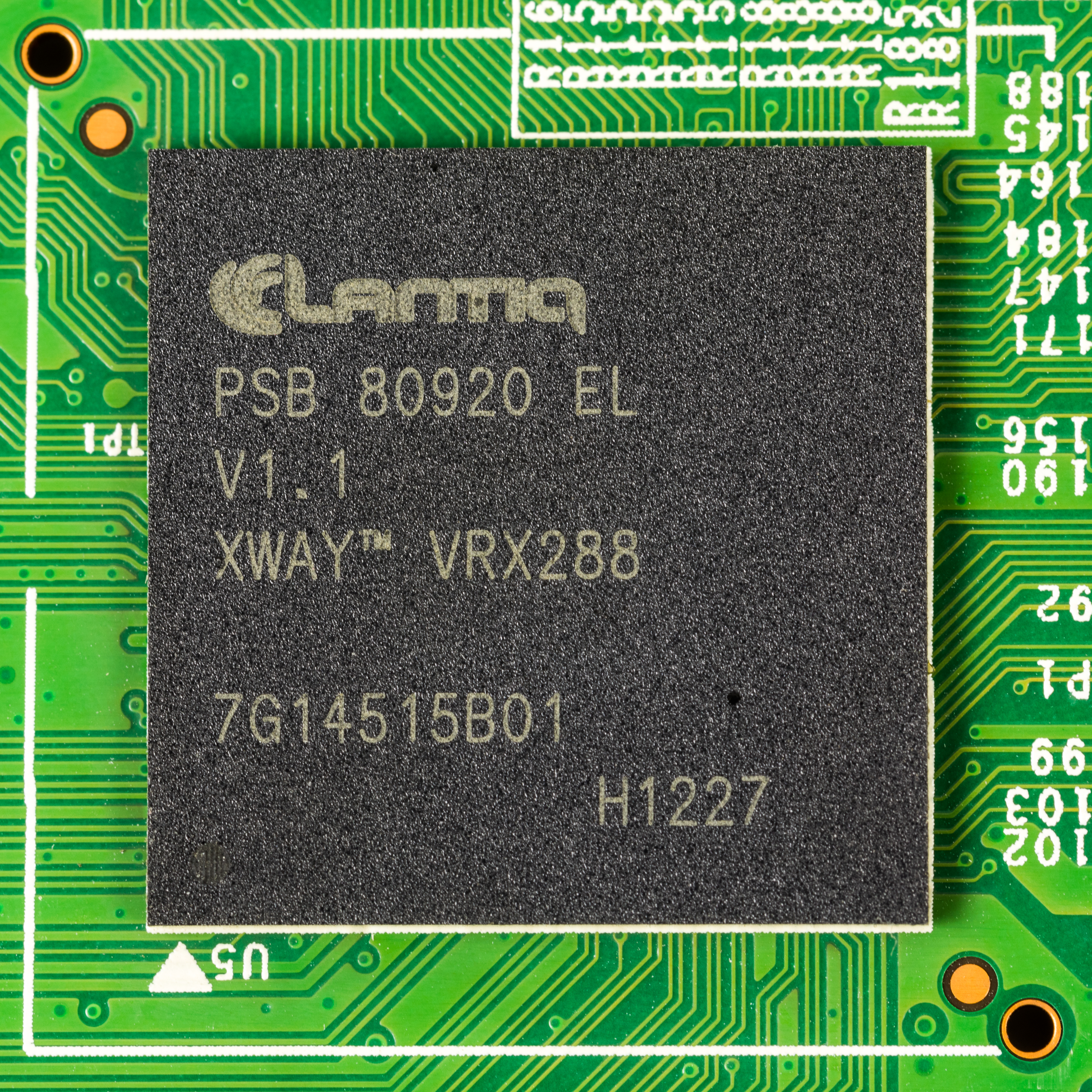
Lantiq XWAY VRX288 V1.1

On 2 February 2015 it was announced that Intel agreed to buy Lantiq (a transaction valued at $345 million) in an attempt to expand its range of chips used in connected Internet-of-Things gadgets and IoT gateways.

Intel sold the business to MaxLinear in 2020.

== Markets ==
Lantiq made semiconductor products for computer networks used by common carrier telecommunications companies in access networks and home networking.

Their products included SOC's (system-on-a-chip) and other integrated circuits for technologies including the digital subscriber line family, VoIP, wireless LAN, Gigabit Ethernet and passive optical networks.

In January 2011 Lantiq announced home networking technology compliant with the ITU-T G.hn standard using the brand name XWAY HNX.

== See also ==
- OpenWrt
- Qualcomm Atheros
- MediaTek
- Ingenic Semiconductor
- STMicroelectronics
- Texas Instruments
