= HP MediaSmart Server =

Line of home servers

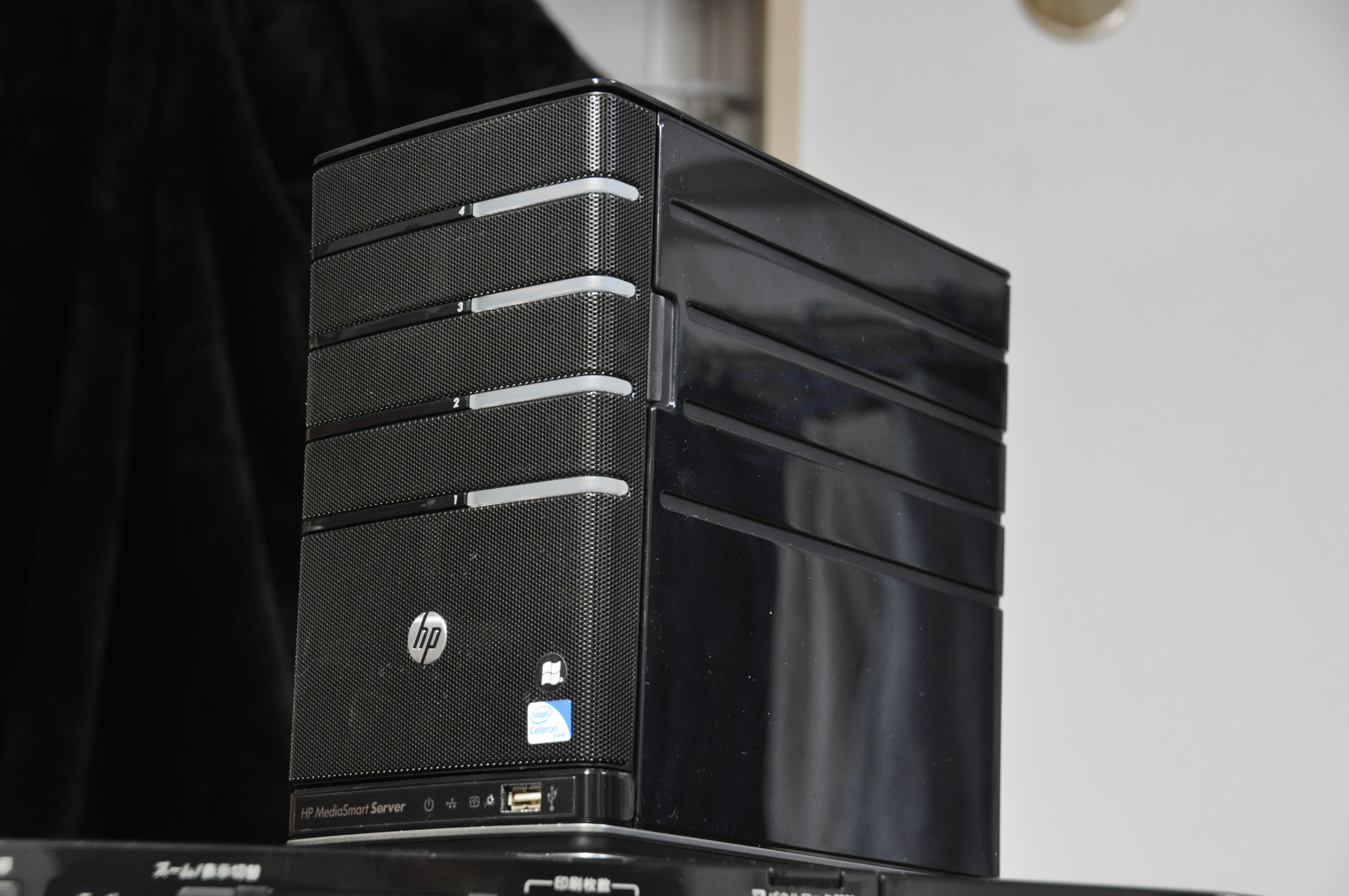
- HP MediaSmart Server EX490
- Manufacturer: Hewlett Packard
- Type: Home Server
- Released: 2008
- Discontinued: 2010
- Predecessor: HP Media Vault
- Successor: HP ProLiant MicroServer

The HP MediaSmart Server is a line of home servers sold by Hewlett-Packard, designed to run Microsoft's Windows Home Server operating system.

== Models ==
HP MediaSmart Server EX470 and EX475
- Cost: US$599 (EX470); US$749 (EX475)
- Processor: AMD Sempron 3400+
- Frequency: 1.8 GHz
- Memory: 512 MB
- Ports: Gigabit Ethernet; 4 USB 2.0; 1 eSATA
- Power consumption: ~52 W (idle, single drive) to ~99 W (full load, 4 drives)
- Weight: 5.17 kg (EX470); 5.76 kg (EX475)
- Dimensions: 14 cm x 25 cm x 23 cm

=== EX470 and EX475 ===
As of October 2008, the HP MediaSmart Server is sold in two models, EX470 (RRP US$599) and EX475 (RRP US$749). They feature a 1.8 GHz AMD Sempron 3400+ processor, one Gigabit Ethernet port, four internal SATA drive bays, four USB 2.0 ports and one eSATA port. The two models are identical with the exception of the amount of included storage: the EX470 has one 500 GB hard drive preinstalled, while the EX475 has two 500 GB hard drives preinstalled.

Hackers and enthusiasts have modded the EX470 by adding a VGA monitor, upgrading the memory from 512 MB to 2 GB and upgrading the processor to a 2.6 GHz AMD LE-1640.

=== EX485 and EX487 ===
On December 29, 2008, HP announced two more models, the EX485 and the EX487, available for pre-orders starting on January 8, 2009. The newer models include support for Apple's Time Machine backup software. They also use a 2.0 GHz Intel Celeron processor, replacing the AMD Sempron from the old models. Other features include a revamped user interface and larger preinstalled hard drives (one 750 GB drive for the EX485; two 750 GB drives in the EX487).

=== LX195 ===
On April 30, 2009, HP announced the MediaSmart Server LX195 which was intended to be a low-cost entry into the Home Server market. The new model featured a single internal 640 GB drive, a 1.6 GHz Intel Atom 230 processor, 1 GB of DDR2 memory, Gigabit Ethernet, and four USB ports for storage expansion. The software features included with the LX195 are the same as the initial launch features of the EX485/EX487 server

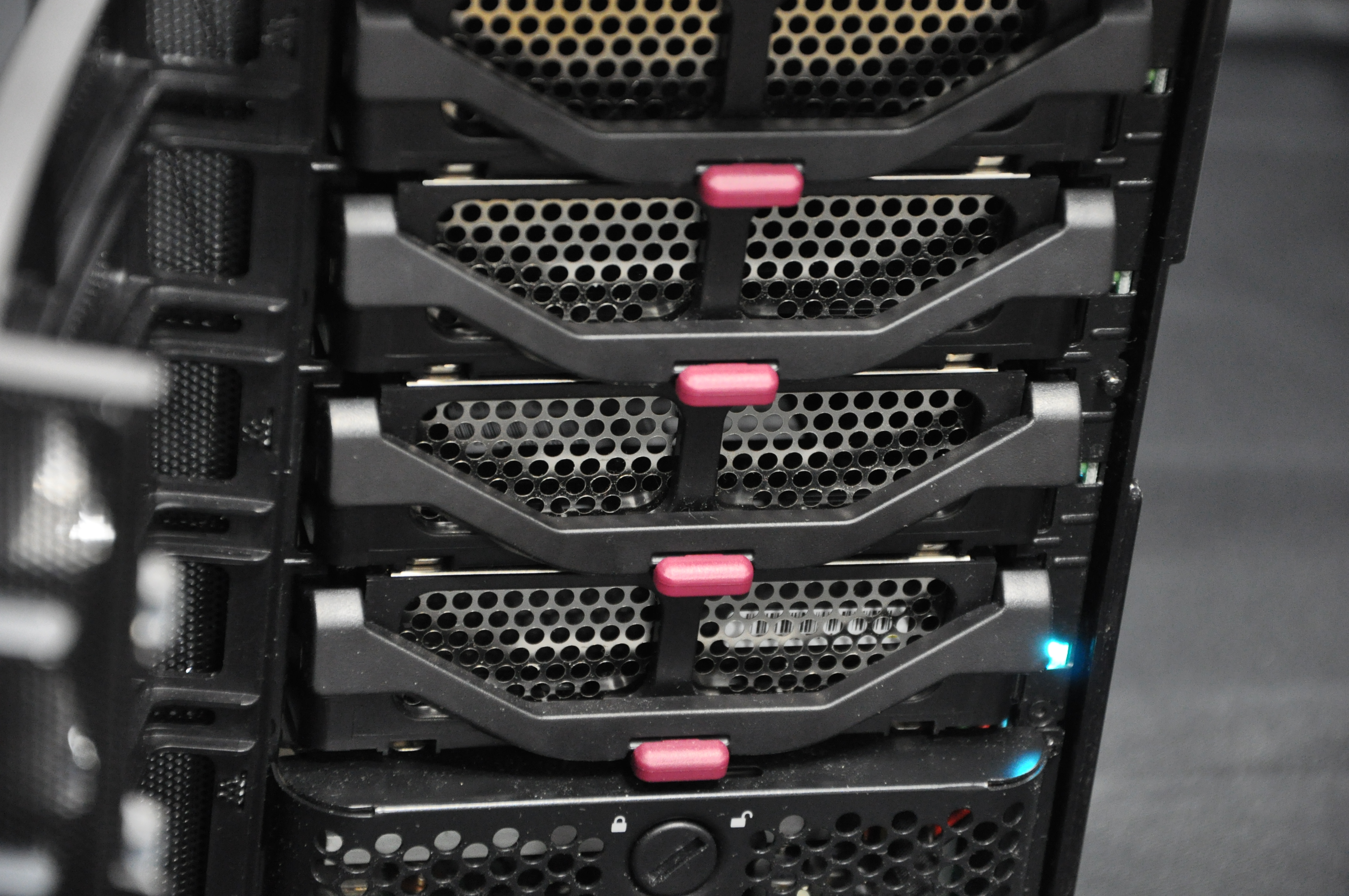
HP MediaSmart Server EX490 hard disk bay

=== EX490 and EX495 ===
On September 14, 2009, HP launched two new MediaSmart servers. The EX490 comes with 1 TB of hard disk storage and costs $549, while the EX495 comes with 1.5 TB and costs $699 both 7200 rpm. The 490 comes with an Intel Celeron Processor 2.2 GHz and the 495 with an Intel Pentium Processor Dual Core 2.5 GHz.

On November 30, 2010, The Windows Home Server team at Microsoft confirmed rumors that HP would not be offering hardware for the next version of Windows Home Server (codenamed "Vail"), and that HP would stop selling MediaSmart servers altogether after the end of the calendar year 2010.

=== DataVault X510 ===
Released on September 29, 2009, the DataVault X510 has identical hardware and software to the MediaSmart Server EX495 and comes with an Intel Pentium Processor Dual Core 2.5 GHz and 2GB of RAM. The DataVault X510 is aimed at small business users.

=== DataVault X310 ===
Released on June 2, 2010, the DataVault X310 comes with an Intel Atom Dual Core 1.6Ghz and 2GB of RAM. The DataVault X310 is aimed at small business users as a cheaper version of the X510. The DataVault X310 software has media streaming features omitted.

== See also ==
- HP MediaSmart Connect
- HP MediaSmart TV
