= Multimedia over Coax Alliance =

International standards consortium

- Abbreviation: MoCA
- Status: Published
- Year started: 2004
- First published: February 2006
- Latest version: 2.5; 13 April 2016
- Preview version: 3.0
- Related standards: Ethernet
- Domain: Computer networking
- License: Proprietary
- Website: mocalliance.org

The Multimedia over Coax Alliance (MoCA) is an international standards consortium that publishes specifications for networking over coaxial cable. The technology was originally developed to distribute IP television in homes using existing cabling, but is now used as a general-purpose Ethernet link where it is inconvenient or undesirable to replace existing coaxial cabling with optical fiber or twisted pair cabling.

MoCA 1.0 was approved in 2006, MoCA 1.1 in April 2010, MoCA 2.0 in June 2010, and MoCA 2.5 in April 2016. The most recently released version of the standard, MoCA 3.0, supports speeds of up to 10 Gbit/s. As of 2021, this technology is not yet available in customer premises equipment.

MoCA technology has evolved through several generations. Early MoCA specifications provided networking speeds suitable for distributing multimedia content within a home, while later versions increased throughput and improved network efficiency.MoCA 2.x introduced substantially higher data rates than the earlier specifications, and MoCA 3.0 further increased the available throughput and was designed for higher-bandwidth residential networking applications.

== Membership ==
As of 2026, the Alliance has 13 members including pay TV operators, OEMs, CE manufacturers, and IC vendors.

MoCA's board of directors consists of staff from InCoax, MaxLinear and Verizon.

== Technology ==
Within the scope of the Internet protocol suite, MoCA is a protocol that provides the link layer. In the seven-layer OSI model, it provides definitions within the data link layer (layer 2) and the physical layer (layer 1). DLNA approved of MoCA as a layer 2 protocol. A MoCA network can contain up to 16 nodes for MoCA 1.1 and higher, with a maximum of 8 for MoCA 1.0. The network provides a shared-medium, half-duplex link between all nodes using time-division multiplexing. Within each timeslot, any pair of nodes communicates directly with each other using the highest mutually-supported version of the standard.

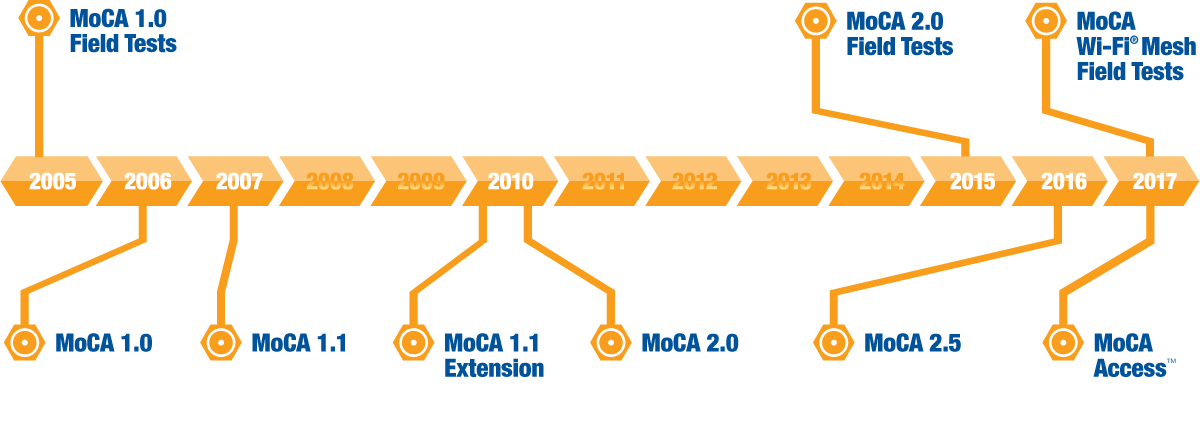
MoCA technology timeline

=== Versions ===
MoCA 1.0
The first version of the standard, MoCA 1.0, was ratified in 2006 and supports transmission speeds of up to 135 Mbit/s.
MoCA 1.1
MoCA 1.1 provides 175 Mbit/s net throughputs (275 Mbit/s PHY rate) and operates in the 500 to 1500 MHz frequency range.
MoCA 2.0
MoCA 2.0 offers actual throughputs (MAC rate) up to 1 Gbit/s. Operating frequency range is 500 to 1650 MHz. Packet error rate is 1 packet error in 100 million. MoCA 2.0 also offers lower power modes of sleep and standby and is backward compatible with MoCA 1.1. In March 2017, SCTE/ISBE society and MoCA consortium began creating a new "standards operational practice" (SCTE 235) to provide MoCA 2.0 with DOCSIS 3.1 interoperability. Interoperability is necessary because both MoCA 2.0 and DOCSIS 3.1 may operate in the frequency range above 1 GHz. The standard "addresses the need to prevent degradation or failure of signals due to a shared frequency range above 1 GHz".
MoCA 2.5
MoCA 2.5 (introduced 13 April 2016) offers actual data rates up to 2.5 Gbit/s, continues to be backward compatible with MoCA 2.0 and MoCA 1.1, and adds MoCA protected setup (MPS), Management Proxy, Enhanced Privacy, Network wide Beacon Power, and Bridge detection. MoCA Access is intended for multiple dwelling units (MDUs) such as hotels, resorts, hospitals, or educational facilities. It is based on the current MoCA 2.0 standard which is capable of 1 Gbit/s net throughputs, and MoCA 2.5 which is capable of 2.5 Gbit/s.
MoCA 3.0 (Next Gen)
The MoCA 3.0 (Next Gen) standard has not been released as of April 2026. However, promotional material provided by the Alliance indicates MAC throughput of up to 10Gbps and reduced latency over the MoCA 2.5 standard.

=== Performance profiles ===
	MoCA 1.0	MoCA 1.1	MoCA 2.0	MoCA 2.0 bonded	MoCA 2.1	MoCA 2.1 bonded	MoCA 2.5	MoCA 3.0
Actual throughput (Mbit/s)	100	175	500	1000	500	1000	2500	10,000
Number of channels bonded				2	2	2	3~5	≤4
Modulation				1024 QAM	1024 QAM	1024 QAM	1024 QAM	8192 QAM
Power save (standby and sleep)			Yes	Yes	Yes	Yes	Yes	Yes
MoCA protected setup; MPS					Yes	Yes	Yes	
Management proxy					Yes	Yes	Yes	
Enhanced privacy						Yes	Yes	
Network-wide beacon power					Yes	Yes	Yes	
Bridge detection					Yes	Yes	Yes	

=== Frequency band plan ===
Channel	Frequency, center (MHz)	MoCA 1.1 channel	MoCA 2.0 primary	MoCA 2.0 secondary	Beacon channel
EE1	450			Yes	
EE2	475			Yes	
E1	500	Yes		Yes	Yes
E2	525	Yes	Yes		Yes
E3	550	Yes	Yes		Yes
E4	575	Yes	Yes		Yes
E5	600	Yes	Yes		Yes
EE3	625		Yes		
EE4	650			Yes	
---	---	---	---	---	---
F1	675	Yes			Yes
F2	700	Yes	Yes	Yes	Yes
F3	725	Yes	Yes		Yes
F4	750	Yes	Yes		Yes
F5	775	Yes	Yes		Yes
F6	800	Yes	Yes		Yes
F7	825	Yes	Yes	Yes	Yes
F8	850	Yes			Yes
---	---	---	---	---	---
A1	875				
B1	900				
---	---	---	---	---	---
C1	925				
C2	950				
C3	975				
C4	1000				
---	---	---	---	---	---
D1	1150	Yes			Yes
D1a	1175		Yes	Yes	
D2	1200	Yes	Yes	Yes	Yes
D2a	1225		Yes	Yes	
D3	1250	Yes	Yes	Yes	Yes
D3a	1275		Yes	Yes	
D4	1300	Yes	Yes	Yes	Yes
D4a	1325		Yes	Yes	
D5	1350	Yes	Yes	Yes	Yes
D5a	1375		Yes	Yes	
D6	1400	Yes	Yes	Yes	Yes
D6a	1425		Yes	Yes	
D7	1450	Yes	Yes	Yes	Yes
D7a	1475		Yes	Yes	
D8	1500	Yes	Yes	Yes	Yes
D8a	1525		Yes	Yes	
D9	1550		Yes	Yes	Yes
D9a	1575		Yes	Yes	
D10	1600		Yes	Yes	Yes
D10a	1625		Yes	Yes	

Notes:

- Channel C4 is commonly used for Verizon FiOS for the "WAN" link from the ONT to the router.
- Channels D1-D8 are commonly used for "LAN" links, between set-top boxes and the router.
- E band channels are commonly used by DirecTV converter boxes. The DirecTV Ethernet-to-Coax Adapter (DECA) uses MoCA on this "Mid-RF" frequency band.
- D10A 100 MHz wide means it goes up to 1675 MHz, so splitters need to be 5-1675 MHz.

== See also ==
- Ethernet over coax
- G.hn
- Home gateway
- Home network
- HomePlug Powerline Alliance
- HomePNA
- IEEE 802.3
- IEEE 802.11
- IEEE 1905
- Ultra-high-definition television
- Wi-Fi over Coax
- Wireless LAN
