= Elsa Technology =

German computer hardware company

ELSA
- Industry: Computer
- Founded: 1980; 46 years ago (originally); 2002 (ELSA Technology Inc.); 1997 (ELSA Japan Inc.)
- Headquarters: Aachen, Germany (originally); Taipei, Taiwan (ELSA Technology Inc.); Tokyo, Japan (ELSA Japan Inc.),
- Products: Graphics cards
- Website: www.elsa-jp.co.jp

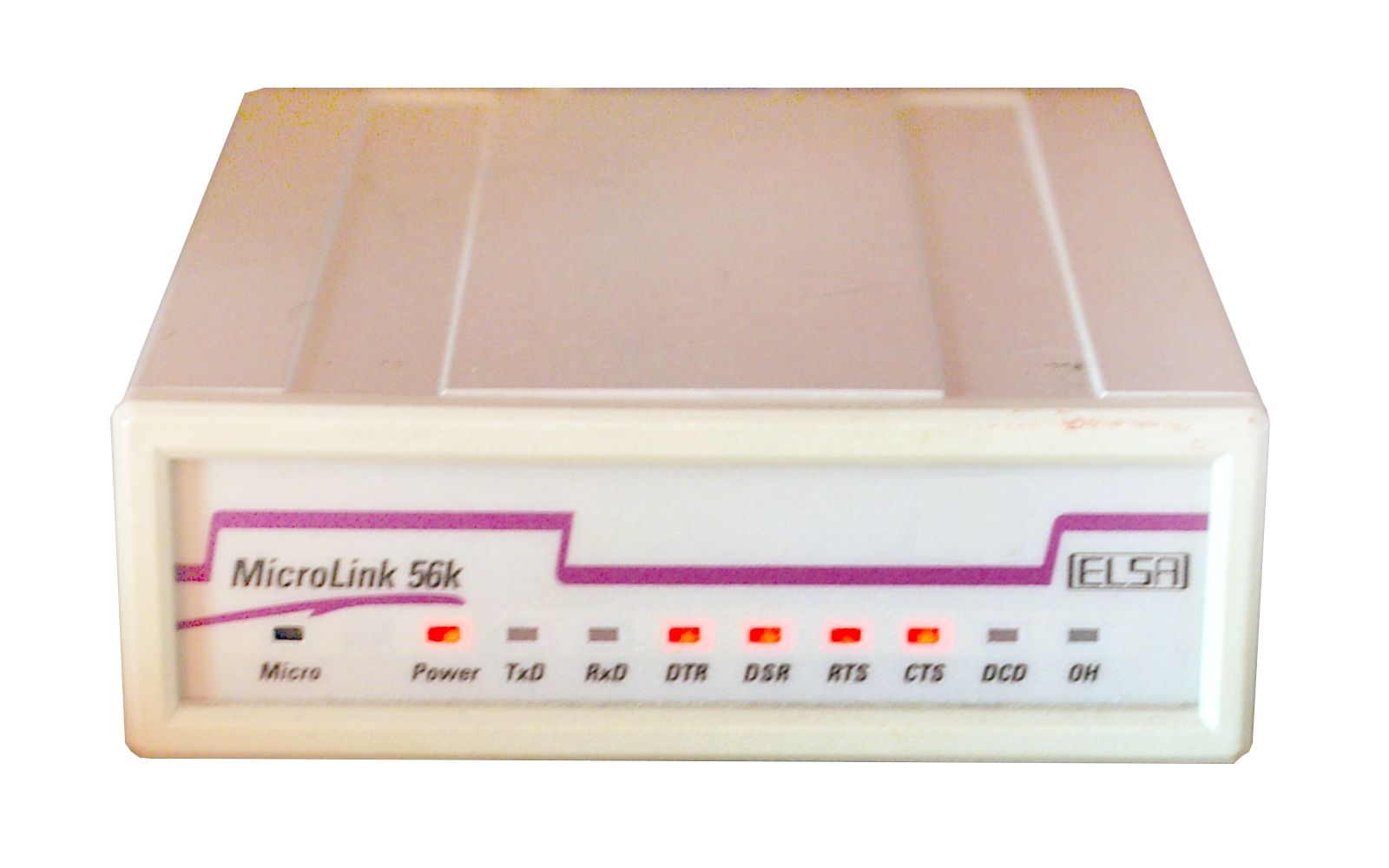
ELSA Microlink modem

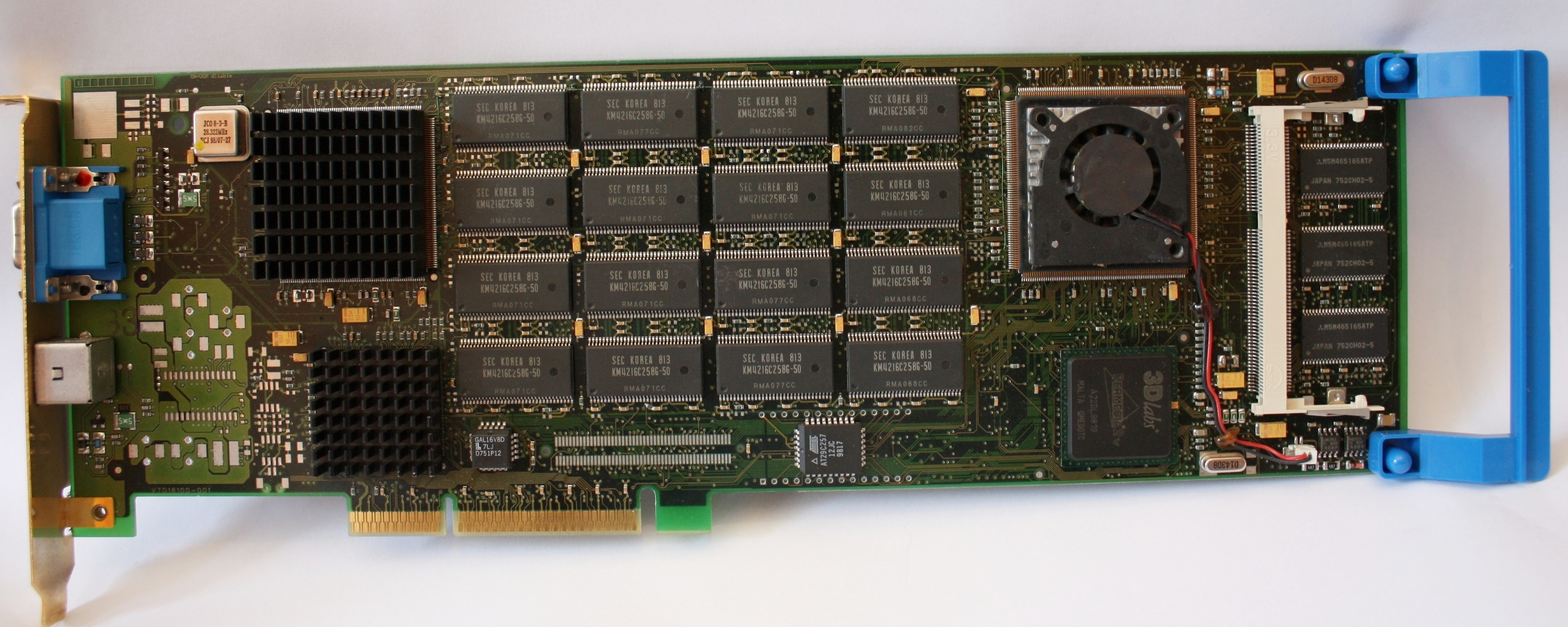
ELSA Gloria XXL AGP video card

Elsa Technology is a computer hardware company. It was founded in 1980 as ELSA Technology AG, a German company manufacturing video cards and other peripherals for Personal Computers. In 2002, the German company filed for bankruptcy while its Taiwanese subsidiary was founded in 2003 as ELSA Technology Inc. Other companies founded when the original ELSA Technology went into bankruptcy were devolo and LANCOM Systems. The ELSA name also continues under the ELSA Japan Inc., which had been founded as a joint venture in 1997, and runs independently since 2002.

== See also ==
- List of networking hardware vendors
