= Entropic Communications =

American semiconductor manufacturer

Entropic Communications is a provider of semiconductor products for the connected home. Founded in 2001, the company is headquartered in San Diego, California, US, and maintains offices worldwide. The fabless semiconductor company invented the MoCA® (Multimedia over Coax Alliance) home networking technology, creating Direct Broadcast Satellite (DBS) Outdoor Unit (ODU) single-wire technology, and developing the industry's first ARM® processor and OpenGL graphics Set-top box (STB), System-on-a-Chip (SoC). Entropic completed its initial public offering on December 7, 2007, listing on the NASDAQ exchange under the ticker symbol ENTR.

Entropic was acquired by MaxLinear for a total consideration of $287 million on February 3, 2015.

== Products ==
Entropic is a semiconductor company in the connected home market and makes Integrated Circuit (IC) technology and platform software:

- STB SoC Solutions: digital STB components and systems for satellite, terrestrial, cable and IP television (IPTV), markets. It primarily consists of STB SoCs, but also includes DOCSIS modems, interface devices and media processors.
- Home Networking: In 2004, Entropic introduced its MoCA home networking product, which was a chipset to use coaxial cable in a home network. It announced MoCA 1.0, 1.1 and MoCA 2.0, and its MoCA chips are deployed at U.S. service providers including Comcast, Cox Communications, DIRECTV, Time Warner Cable, and Verizon as well as in Europe via UPC/Liberty Global.
- Broadband Access Solutions: Entropic delivers Ethernet-over-Coax (EoC) broadband access products, under its c.LINK™ brand. The EoC technology delivers "last few hundred meter" connectivity for broadband access to single-family homes and multiple dwelling units. It is predominantly deployed in China, and helps MSOs meet the government-mandated Next Generation Broadband (NGB) initiative.
- Direct Broadcast Satellite Outdoor Unit (DBS ODU) Solutions: This technology claims to simplify the installation required for simultaneous reception of multiple channels from multiple satellites over a single cable. It includes ICs for its Band Translation Switch (BTS), Channel Stacking Switch (CSS™) and digital Channel Stacking Switch. It is deployed at DBS operators including DIRECTV, DISH Network, Canal Digital and Sky Italia.

== In Asia ==
In 2005, the company opened its Asia regional headquarters in Hong Kong. It also started operating in Korea in 2010 and in Japan in 2011.

== Controversy ==
In March 2014, Entropic's former CEO Patrick Henry was charged with three misdemeanors. Two of the charges were dropped. The third was reduced to an infraction. The charges stemmed from an altercation at Sundance Film Festival involving reality TV star Ariane Bellamar. On June 19, 2014, he was found guilty of the assault charge; his sentence consisted of a $400 fine and 40 hours of community service. He was also ordered to undergo an assessment for alcohol and anger management. Patrick Henry was not terminated from his position. In September 2014, Entropic hired Barclays to explore the possibilities of selling the business, which concluded with a sale to MaxLinear on February 3, 2015. Patrick Henry resigned as CEO prior to the sale, in November 2014.

On November 10, 2014, a decision by the board of directors stated that it was the right time for a leadership transition, leading to Dr. Ted Tewksbury replacing Patrick Henry as interim President and Chief Executive Officer.

== Major acquisitions ==
- RF Magic, Inc. (2007) – Acquisition of DBS ODU technology and products
- Trident Microsystems, Inc. (2012) acquisition of selected assets related to Trident's STB SoC solutions, including digital STB components and systems for satellite, terrestrial, cable and IP television (IPTV), markets
- PLX Technology, Inc. (2012) – Acquisition of selected assets relating to PLX's direct broadcast satellite intellectual property and corresponding technologies including the digital channel stacking switch (dCSS) semiconductor product
- Mobius Semiconductor, Inc. (2013) – Acquisition of assets related to analog mixed-signal semiconductor solutions, including ADCs, DACs, ADPLLs, SerDes and other proprietary intellectual property
