= Sigma Designs =

American semiconductor manufacturer (1982–2018)

Sigma Designs, Inc.
- Type: Public
- Traded as: Nasdaq: SIGM
- Industry: Semiconductor
- Founded: 1982; 44 years ago
- Defunct: April 18, 2018
- Fate: liquidated
- Headquarters: Fremont, California United States
- Products: System-on-a-chip
- Website: sigmadesigns.com

Sigma Designs, Inc., was an American public corporation that designed and built high-performance system-on-a-chip semiconductor technologies for Internet-based set-top boxes, DVD players/recorders, high-definition televisions, media processors, digital media adapters, portable media players and home connectivity products. In addition to platform processing and home network hardware, Sigma Designs also offered engineering support services and customized integrated circuit development.

The company developed products for the following connected media platforms: IPTV (video over IP) set-top boxes, TV media players (such as Blu-ray), HDTVs, multimedia players, digital media adapters, portable media players, and home networking products, such as HomePlug AV, HomePNA and G.hn. Sigma Designs owns the intellectual property and was one of two chip makers for the Z-Wave home control technology. Sigma had alliances with other technology companies, including Microsoft, and their products are found in stand-alone full HD multimedia players.

== History ==
Sigma Designs was founded in 1982 and is based in Fremont, California, with locations in Canada, Denmark, France, Israel, Japan, Netherlands and Singapore. In September 2002, Sigma Designs and Thirdspace, the broadband TV enablement company, announced that they were combining technologies to improve the quality of streaming video solutions over broadband Internet Protocol (IP) networks.

Sigma Designs began making boards for computers, such as the RealMagic MPEG decoder. Its products were used in many of the first Blu-ray players since 2005. Sigma media processors also have more than ten-year history in the IPTV market.

In late 2007 Sigma Designs released the first 1080p capable media player chipset, the SMP863x. It spawned a series of stand-alone media players from early 2008 onwards.

Sigma Designs' products were sold worldwide through a direct sales force and distributors. Sigma's Common Stock, publicly traded since 1986, was listed on the NASDAQ National Market under the symbol SIGM.

On December 7, 2017, Silicon Labs announced a definitive agreement to acquire Sigma for approximately $282m. On January 23, 2018, Sigma announced it was unable to meet certain closing conditions, and instead it planned to sell its Z-Wave business to Silicon Labs for $240m, and liquidate the company. The sale of the Z-Wave business to Silicon Labs was completed on April 18, 2018.

== Acquisitions ==
On February 8, 2008, Sigma Designs completed its acquisition of Canadian manufacturer Gennum's VXP image processing business. This technology was used in video projectors. In January 2011, Sigma announced it was adding the VXP technology to its SMP8910 system-on-a-chip.

On December 18, 2008, Sigma Designs announced the acquisition of California-based Zensys, a company that provides the wireless mesh networking technology Z-Wave.

On October 14, 2009, Sigma purchased Israeli home-networking chip maker CopperGate for $160 million in cash and stock. CopperGate technologies included HomePNA and HomePlug AV networking technologies. Sigma has since updated HomePlug AV to include ClearPath, an award-winning technology which significantly increases throughput.

On March 21, 2012, Sigma announced that it has signed an asset purchase agreement to serve as the "stalking horse bidder" to acquire certain assets of Trident Microsystems, Inc.’s Digital Television (DTV) Business, which includes certain products, licensed intellectual property, software and leased facilities, for $21 million in cash plus assumption of specified liabilities.

== Product divisions ==
Sigma Designs provides system-on-a-chip (SoC) products to deliver entertainment and control to consumers:

=== Media and video processing ===
On July 9, 2010, Sigma Designs announced its media processors were used by French company, Free Inc., to deliver the first 3D broadcasts of the World Cup, as well as Europe’s first ongoing 3D content.

Sigma Designs offers media and video processing technology, with the SMP8910 and SMP8670 processors, introduced at the 2011 Consumer Electronics Show. The 2011 technology offered VXP video processing to clean up artifacts and picture quality on High Definition and 3D content. Although the 8910 chipset was announced at CES (January) 2011, no implementations of this chipset seemed imminent until September 2012. In September 2012, Syabas demonstrated its new Popcorn Hour A-400 media player using the 8911 non-macromedia version of the 8910 chipset at IFA 2012 and Cedia 2012. It is expected to start shipping November 2012.

=== Home AV Networking ===
Sigma Designs' AV Network products include:

- HomePNA and HomePlug AV products use existing wires in homes (coaxial cable, phone lines, or AC power lines) and deliver as much as 200 Mbit/s of throughput. These are marketed with what the company calls ClearPath technology which avoids noise on typical power lines. As of November 2010, Sigma Designs shipped more than 20 million HomePNA chipsets.
- Sigma announced G.hn products in October 2010 claimed to be capable of delivering up to 3 Gbit/s. These were marketed under the name ClearPath Extreme.

In June 2011, Sigma announced an “Ultra-Thin Set-Top Box” reference platform named Skini that provides over-the-top content along with over-the-air and cable functionality.

=== Home control ===
Sigma Designs develops and markets the Z-Wave protocol for home control. Z-Wave is a wireless radio frequency communications technology designed for control and status reading applications in residential and light commercial environments. Z-Wave has an alliance and more than 1,500 interoperable products in a certification program. On May 23, 2011, Sigma announced Japanese manufacturer Mitsumi as a licensed second source for Z-Wave technology. The company secured Verizon as a partner, with the telecom giant expected to roll out home control and security services through Z-Wave in the fall of 2011.

=== Color 400 ===
The SDC 400 — is a IBM-PC-compatible graphics card designed by Sigma Designs to compete with the EGA. It offers all the capabilities of a CGA card and also supports three new display modes: 80×30 text, 80×50 text, and 640×400 graphics with 16 colors. The card contains two 8 KB ROM chips; one contains 8x8 and 8x16 fonts for text modes, and the other contains 6 KB of BIOS code and an 8×16 font for 640×400 graphics mode. It supports:

- Windows 1.0
- GEM
- ViewMAX
- Lotus 1-2-3
- PC Paintbrush
- Halo DPE
- The Colonel's Bequest

== Xvid controversy ==
In July 2002, Sigma Designs released an MPEG-4 video codec called the REALmagic MPEG-4 Video Codec. Before long, people testing this new codec found that it contained considerable portions of Xvid code. Sigma Designs was contacted and confirmed that a programmer had based REALmagic on Xvid, but assured that all GPL code would be replaced to avoid copyright infringement. When Sigma Designs released the supposedly rewritten REALmagic codec, the Xvid developers immediately disassembled it and concluded that it still contained Xvid code, only rearranged in an attempt to disguise its presence. The Xvid developers decided to stop work and go public to force Sigma Designs to respect the terms of the GPL. After articles were published in Slashdot and The Inquirer, in August 2002 Sigma Designs agreed to publish its source code.

== See also ==
- System-on-a-chip
- G.hn
- Home network
- Media processor
- IPTV
- Home PNA
- HomePlug AV
- Z-Wave
