= HP MediaSmart Connect =

HP MediaSmart Connect is a digital media player that streams or syncs media from other personal computers in an area with Wi-Fi connectivity to be played and accessed on a television screen.

It utilizes Windows Media Center Extender for the television user interface of the MediaSmart Connect box.

It is also part of Hewlett-Packard's current MediaSmart brand, alongside HP MediaSmart Server and HP MediaSmart TV.
