= Wi-Fi over Coax =

Wi-Fi over Coax is a technology for extending and distributing Wi-Fi signals via coaxial cables. As an in-building wireless solution, Wi-Fi over Coax can make use of existing or new cabling with native impedance of 50 Ω shared by a Wi-Fi access point, cabling run, and antenna. Coaxial cables with characteristic impedance of 75 Ω, such as RG-6 cables used for in-building television distribution, can also be used by incorporating impedance converters. As part of a distributed antenna system, Wi-Fi over Coax can connect multiple floors of a home or office via power dividers and zoned antennas either passively or via amplifiers, potentially eliminating the need for multiple access points.

== Range ==
By avoiding signal attenuation caused by obstructions and free-space path loss, Wi-Fi over Coax can increase Wi-Fi coverage beyond the minimum receiver sensitivity attainable by Wi-Fi over the air alone. While the Wi-Fi signal from a radio chain with 23 dBm transmit power may be attenuated by 10...15 dB when passing through a concrete wall, the corresponding attenuation for Wi-Fi over Coax may be limited to the specific cable assembly loss for the width of the wall. As expressed by the minimum acceptable received signal strength indication (RSSI) for the client device, maximum range via Wi-Fi over coax varies based on transmit power of the access point radio chain, the wireless LAN (WLAN) frequency or frequencies being transmitted, the type and length of the cabling run, assembly loss caused by the specific connectors used, and antenna gain. When using 23 dBm of transmit power from an access point radio chain, a Wi-Fi signal at channel 1 (2412 MHz) may be transmitted over 64 metres (210 ft) of RG-6 cabling with a maximum RSSI of −9.9 dBm, or over 340 metres (1,130 ft) of LMR-900-DB cabling with a maximum RSSI of −13.5 dBm.

== Applications ==
As with distributed antenna systems deployed by mobile network operators, Wi-Fi over Coax allows client devices at various antenna locations to connect to a single network, with fronthaul via cabling runs between the distributed antennas and a baseband Wi-Fi radio on an access point. In contrast to fast roaming supported by IEEE 802.11r-2008, no key negotiation or processing is necessary between the access point and a client device when roaming between antennas on a Wi-Fi over Coax DAS, permitting seamless native handoffs. Since a Wi-Fi over Coax deployment may use a single access point as opposed to multiple access points or range extenders, wireless transmission and interference is not doubled, resulting in greater use of channel capacity per the modulation and coding scheme and greater throughput (expressed in Mbps). While dual-band WLAN channels can be transmitted over coaxial cabling where an access point uses interleaved radio chains for 2.4 and 5 GHz, Wi-Fi over coax may require diplexers for concurrent use with other frequencies, such as those supported by MoCA products.
