= Silicon Motion =

American-Taiwanese electronics company

Silicon Motion Technology Corporation
- Native name: 慧榮科技
- Romanized name: Huirong Technology
- Type: Public
- Traded as: Nasdaq: SIMO
- Industry: Semiconductors; Solid-state drives
- Founded: November 1995; 30 years ago
- Headquarters: Zhubei, Taiwan (global), California, United States (corporate)
- Area served: Worldwide
- Key people: James Chow (chairman); Wallace Kou (president & CEO)
- Products: NAND Flash Controllers; (SSD / eMMC / Flash Card / UFD Controllers); Single-Package SSD Solutions; Enterprise SSD Solutions (Shannon brand); Embedded Graphics
- Revenue: ▼US$639 million (2023)
- Operating income: ▼US$39.9 million (2023)
- Net income: ▼US$52.9 million (2023)
- Total assets: ▲US$1.01 billion (2023)
- Total equity: ▲US$735 million (2023)
- Number of employees: 1,546 (2023)

Silicon Motion Technology Corporation (SMI), stylized as SiliconMotion, is an American-Taiwanese company involved in developing NAND flash controller integrated circuits (ICs) for solid-state storage devices. The company has claimed to have supplied more NAND flash controllers than any other company, over five billion from 2006 through 2016. They are found in commercial, enterprise, and industrial applications ranging from SSDs, eMMCs, memory cards, and USB flash drives.

Silicon Motion purchased Shannon Systems which added PCI Express solid-state drives for the Chinese data center market to its portfolio. Controllers are marketed under the “SMI” brand, enterprise-grade SSDs under the "Shannon Systems" brand.

== History ==
Silicon Motion Technology Corporation was formed as the combination of Silicon Motion, Inc., which was established in 1995 in Silicon Valley in the United States, and Feiya Technology Corporation, which was founded in 1997 in Taipei, Taiwan. At the time, mobile graphic chips were the main product of Silicon Motion and NAND controllers were the main products of Feiya Technology Corporation. In 2002, Concord Asia Capital (now known as Concord Venture Capital Group), mediated the merger of the two companies which was completed in August 2002. In 2005, the combined company was renamed Silicon Motion Technology Corporation and began listing on the NASDAQ stock market under the SIMO ticker symbol.

- November 1995: Silicon Motion was established in Silicon Valley, U.S.A.
- April 1997: Feiya Technology Corporation was established in Taipei, Taiwan.
- August 2002: Silicon Motion, Inc. was combined with Feiya Technology Corporation in Taiwan. The headquarters was located in Hsinchu County, Taiwan.
- June 2003: Silicon Motion was added to the stock listings of the Taiwan Stock Exchange (TWSE).
- March 2005: The company decided to go public in the US. Silicon Motion Technology Corporation was established in the Cayman Islands, and transferred 100% of its stocks to its branch in Taiwan. The company terminated its application for an emerging stock transaction and withdrew the issuance of its stocks.
- April 2005: The company’s listing on the TWSE was terminated.
- June 2005: The company was listed on the NASDAQ stock market (Nasdaq: SIMO).
- April 2007: The company completed its acquisition of Future Communications IC, Inc. (FCI) for US$90 million.
- December 2012: The company received "2012 Best Financially Managed Company (<$500 million revenue) Award" presented by the Global Semiconductor Alliance (GSA).
- July 2015: The company completed its acquisition of Shannon Systems for US$57.5 million.
- December 2016: The company received "2016 Best Financially Managed Company (<$1 billion revenue) Award" presented by the Global Semiconductor Alliance (GSA).
- May 2019: The company announced that it has completed the sale of FCI, its Mobile Communications product line, to Dialog Semiconductor.
- May 2022: MaxLinear to acquire Silicon Motion.
- July 2023: MaxLinear scrapped the acquisition stating that Silicon Motion had failed to complete some of the acquisition closing conditions and suffered a "material adverse effect".

== Products ==
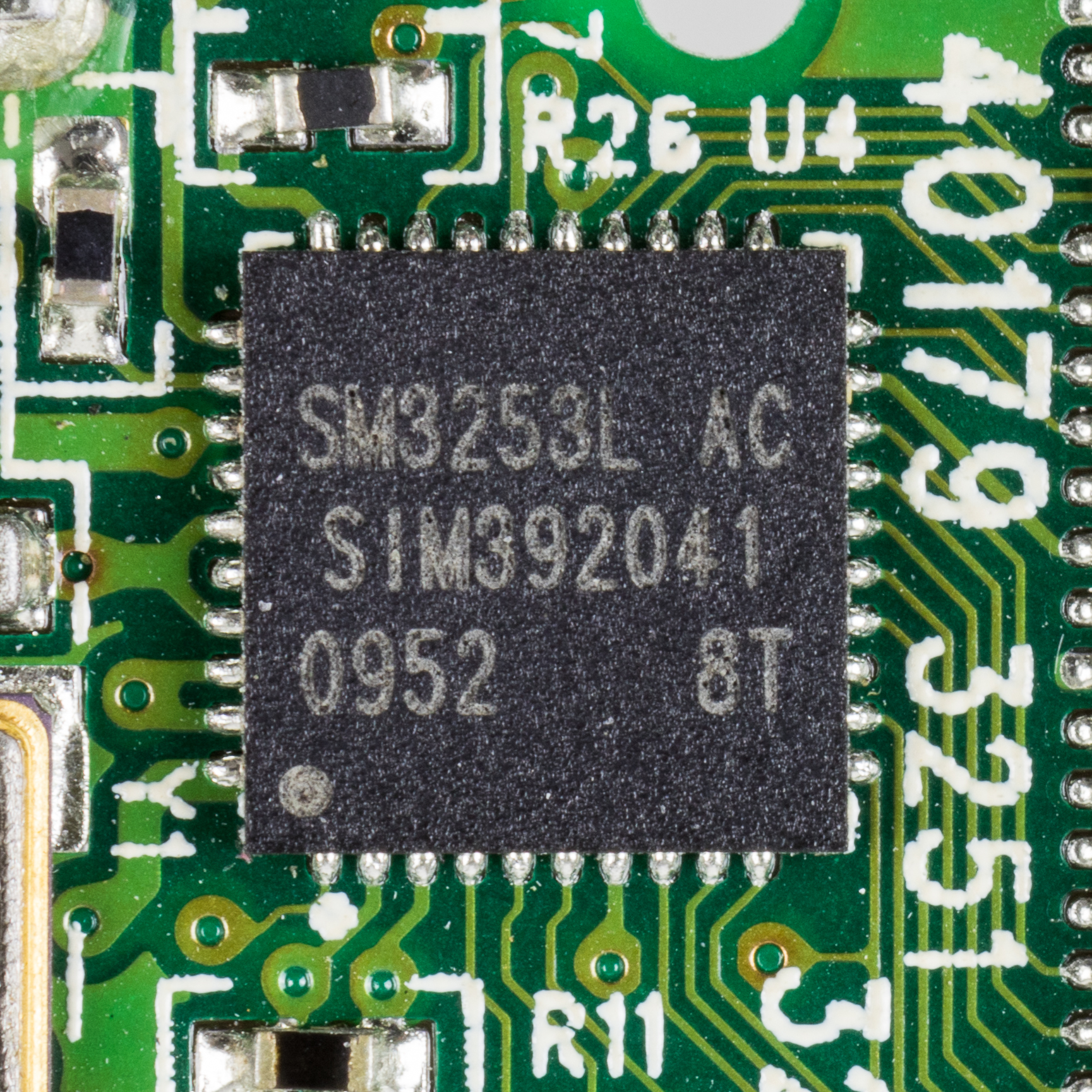
SM3253L flash memory controller on a USB flash drive

Embedded storage products

- SSD controllers
- eMMC controllers
- Ferroelectric storage
- Embedded flash controllers
- Enterprise/data center SSDs marketed under the Shannon brand

Expandable storage products

- Memory card controllers
- USB flash drive controllers

Embedded graphics products

- Embedded GPUs
- USB display controllers
