= Michael Gregory (actor) =

American actor

- Born: Gary Steven Meimar; November 26, 1944 (age 81); Brooklyn, New York, U.S.
- Occupation: Actor
- Years active: 1963–present

Michael Gregory (born November 26, 1944) is an American character actor, with a variety of roles in television, films and commercials, as well as working as a voice actor in animation & video games.

== Early life ==
He was born Gary Steven Meimar in Brooklyn, New York, the son of Sally and Angelo Socrates Meimar. He joined the United States army and served as a personnel specialist. He has an AA from Hartnell College and a BA from San Francisco State University. He lives in Salinas, California.

== Career ==
Gregory had a role in an episode of the TV series The Partridge Family in 1971. Other guest appearances include All in the Family, Kojak, Gunsmoke, Fantasy Island, Voyagers!, The A-Team, The Love Boat, Quincy, Simon & Simon, Matlock, Murphy Brown, Quantum Leap, JAG, Ghost Whisperer, MacGyver (S06-E20) and Full House.

He originated the role of Dr. Rick Webber in episodes of the soap opera General Hospital, from 1976 to 1978, and played Nikolai in three episodes of Dynasty in 1985.

== Selected filmography ==
- Mr. Ricco (1975) – Tanner
- Beverly Hills Cop (1984) – Beverly Palms Hotel Manager
- Band of the Hand (1986) – Van Guard
- RoboCop (1987) – Lieutenant Hedgecock
- The Couch Trip (1988) – Security at Riviera
- Total Recall (1990) – Rebel Lieutenant
- Prime Target (1991) – Agent Robbins
- Eraser (1996) – Leiman

=== Anime roles ===
- The Castle of Cagliostro - Goemon Ishikawa XIII
- Cowboy Bebop – Laughing Bull
- Fushigi Yûgi – Mitsukake (OVA 1 only)
- Ghost in the Shell: Stand Alone Complex – Tsujisaki
- Ghost in the Shell: S.A.C. 2nd GIG – Renjo Sokichi
- Ghost in the Shell: Stand Alone Complex - Solid State Society – Chief Nakamura
- Kikaider – Professor Gill
- Mobile Suit Gundam 0083: Stardust Memory – Alpha Bate
- Sol Bianca: The Legacy – Gyunter
- Serial Experiments Lain – Totem
- Trigun – Brilliant Dynamites Neon

=== Video game roles ===
- The BOUNCER – Volt Krueger
- Dota 2 – Bounty Hunter, Silencer, Clinkz
- Star Wars: The Old Republic – Commander Harron Tavus, Nomen Karr
- The Horde – Kronus Maelor
- Cyberpunk 2077 – Viktor Vektor
