= Tonido =

- Developer(s): CodeLathe LLC
- Initial release: March 2009
- Stable release: 14.90.0.34030 / 13 January 2017; 8 years ago
- Written in: Backend: C++, GUI: Google Web Toolkit and PHP
- Operating system: Cross-platform
- Type: Personal Cloud, Home Server
- License: Freeware
- Website: www.tonido.com

Tonido was remote access and home server software for network-attached storage. It closed down operations in 2022.

Once installed on a computer, Tonido software made that computer's files available remotely via the internet through the web browser or through native mobile apps. This allowed access to files stored on the computer, including music and videos, to any computing device connected to the Internet in possession of login credentials. Data was by default transmitted via Tonido's servers, with no port forwarding required, but could be transmitted without using Tonido's servers by setting up port forwarding. Data transfer speed cannot exceed that of the slowest link in the data path, including USB 2.0 for USB-connected storage.

Tonido stored all user information including login credentials locally, enabling login into Tonido software without the requirement of an internet connection.

Tonido allowed different computing devices to synchronise files via a Tonido server, without using the public computing "cloud". Synchronisation used Tonido's servers; the company provided 2 GB of synchronised storage free of charge, and 100 GB for Pro users.

Tonido ran on x86, ARM, PowerPC and MIPS architectures, and was available as binary packages for popular Linux distributions such as Ubuntu, Fedora, and OpenSUSE, and for Mac OS X and Windows.

Tonido sold a small computer that ran Tonido software. The TonidoPlug is based on the SheevaPlug, running Ubuntu Linux.
