= The Horde (video game) =

1994 video game

- Developers: Toys for Bob; Silicon Knights (Saturn)
- Publisher: Crystal Dynamics
- Designers: Paul Reiche III; Fred Ford
- Platforms: 3DO, MS-DOS, Saturn, FM Towns
- Release: 3DO: NA: March 8, 1994; JP: July 23, 1994; MS-DOS: NA: 1994; EU: 1994; Saturn: EU: May 1996; NA: 1996; FM Towns: JP: April 28, 1995
- Genre: Strategy
- Mode: Single-player

The Horde is a hybrid action-strategy video game developed for 3DO by Toys for Bob. It was published in 1994 by Crystal Dynamics, then ported to the Saturn, MS-DOS, and FM Towns. In The Horde, the player constructs buildings and defenses, then protects them against attacking monsters. The game includes full-motion video sequences with Kirk Cameron as Chauncey and Michael Gregory as Kronus Maelor. Video sequences were reduced to slide shows (with sound) in some versions.

The MS-DOS port was bundled with the RealMagic MPEG playback card as a demonstration of the card's abilities to play back full-motion MPEG video via the card's hardware decoder.

The music was composed by Burke Trieschmann and won Computer Gaming World's Premiere Award for Best Musical Score in 1994.

== Plot ==
The player controls a servant boy, Chauncey, who was raised by a herd of wild cows. In a fortunate mishap, Chauncey prevents Winthrop the Good, King of Franzpowanki, from choking on his meal and is rewarded with a plot of land upon which he may build a self-sustaining town. However, the land is under constant attack by "The Horde". The Horde consists of a number of destructive and hungry red monsters referred to individually as Hordlings.

== Gameplay ==
The Horde has elements of hack and slash and city building. It is played in alternating timed phases. Each season begins with a "build" phase in which the player develops a town with the resources at Chauncey's disposal. This includes constructing walls, setting traps, chopping down trees, and landscaping. Buildings, roads, crops, and residents are all added to the town automatically between seasons. The player is given only two minutes for each build phase.

Then comes the "action" phase, where the player must defend the town from an onslaught of Hordlings with a huge sword, Grimthwacker, and various magical items. Using items costs money, explained as a conversion to magical power with Chauncey's ATM ("Automated Transfer of Mana") card. Hordlings occasionally drop money when defeated, which may be retrieved and used, but the main sources of income are cows and crops, which are also sought by the Hordlings. If Chauncey runs out of health or all of the town's people are eaten by Hordlings, the game ends.

At the end of the action phase, the season has ended and the player receives a report on how well the town has been managed. The player turns a profit by protecting the town's resources. At the end of Summer seasons, the player may receive a message through a crystal ball from King Winthrop the Good, Kronus Maelor (the "Evil High Chancellor"), or the FNN ("Franzpowanki News Network"). With the exception of certain comic relief messages, these can have a direct influence on every aspect of the game.

At the end of each year, Kronus Maelor collects and raises taxes. The player then has the opportunity to save the game and buy special items. At the end of a set number of years, the player character is given charge of a new region of the kingdom and must start a new village there. Each new location features the challenges of different terrain and new breeds of Hordling, as well as hidden items (sometimes obtained through side-quests) and new special items at the store. The game is won by completing all five regions.

== Development ==
Lead artist Michael Provenza recounted how he designed the hordlings:

I got some concept drawings before I started, and I was able to model them in a 3D software package. To give each animation personality, I acted out what the hordlings would look like when they did something. For example, the shaman is an old dude. I decided he would walk with a gimp. I grabbed a golf club and walked around the office as I imagined that character would. To get the motion of the walk right, I tried to imagine what it would be like to walk with long arms, short legs, a big body, and a big head. Then I started animating by hand with the 3D modeling software, Alias, and claymation. It takes about four days to build a character from scratch, animate it, and add texture mapping.

Kirk Cameron plays the teenage hero Chauncey, and Michael Gregory plays the Chancellor. All the live-action footage for the game was filmed in two days.

The initial 3DO version of the game intentionally deleted other saved game files to make room for The Horde's save file. The publisher eventually recognized this behavior was generally disliked by players, and offered to replace discs with a copy of the game that prompted before deleting other files.

== Reception ==
Reception

Review scores
| Publication | Score |
|---|---|
| AllGame | 4/5 (3DO) |
| Electronic Gaming Monthly | 8/10, 8/10, 7/10, 7/10, 8/10 (3DO) |
| Famitsu | 9/10, 7/10, 8/10, 6/10 (3DO) |
| Maximum | 4/5 (SAT) |
| Sega Saturn Magazine | 90% (SAT) |
| 3DO Magazine | 5/5 (3DO) |

The Horde received generally positive reviews. In April 1994 Computer Gaming World said of the PC version that "excellent acting and game play combined with twisted humor ... should make this a winner". The magazine in May 1994 said that "The Horde is a hybrid of the most editor-baffling kind, and what's more aggravating, it's good. Extremely good!". The reviewer praised its combination of resource management and action in varying settings, wonderful animation, and "amazingly good" video clips, stating that Gregory's "show-stealing Evil Chancellor" made the game "a must see". He concluded that "The Horde is remarkably well rounded", and "without question" would win awards in "whichever category that might be". GamePro's Game Over Man gave the 3DO version a perfect score in all four categories (graphics, sound, control, and FunFactor), citing the large number of stages, good controls, the overhead "satellite view", the outrageous hordling TV propaganda FMV clips, and use of audio to alert the player to off-screen situations. He concluded: "This imaginative game tries to do something different, and it works". Four reviewers in Famicom Tsūshin reviewed the game for the 3DO. Two reviewers found it similar to an older PC-Engine game Daichi-kun Crisis (1989) and said that it was confusing at first, but once that is resolved players would be hooked. Another reviews said it was lacking in terms of pure pleasure of the Sim series, but the presentation and game itself feel fresh. The final reviewer said the game grew dull as you are defending an area that never expands and found that the to be the lacking element in The Horde.

Reviewing the Saturn version in GamePro, Johnny Ballgame called it "a clever and addicting game that should be eaten up by all Saturn owners". He particularly praised the challenging gameplay, exceptionally clean FMV, and the ability to locate hordlings by sound. David Hodgson of Sega Saturn Magazine gave the Saturn version a 90%, citing the "weird and wonderful gameplay", "genuinely humorous" sound effects, and "perfect difficulty level and learning curve", and said it was a perfect port of the 3DO original. Hodgson also reviewed the game in Maximum, where he made similar praise.

The Horde won Computer Gaming World's Best Musical Score award in June 1994. The editors wrote: "Not only do we like the funky, whimsical riffs within the score, but we appreciate the way that every type of terrain or genus of hordling has its own musical theme". Gregory won the Best On-Screen Performance award for his role in The Horde, and the editors noted that they were particularly impressed with the way Gregory communicates via body language and facial expressions, even in scenes where he has no speaking part. VideoGames selected it as a runner-up for 1994's Best Strategy Game award, which was won by Equinox.
