= G.9970 =

G.9970 (also known as G.hnta) is a Recommendation developed by ITU-T that describes the generic transport architecture for home networks and their interfaces to a provider's access network.

G.9970 was developed by Study Group 15, Question 1. G.9970 received Consent on December 12, 2008 and was Approved on January 13, 2009.

== Relationship with G.hn ==
Relationship between G.hnta and G.hn

G.9970 (G.hnta) and G.9960 (G.hn) are two ITU-T Recommendations that address home networking in a complementary manner. While G.9970 addresses layer 3 (network layer) of the home network architecture, G.9960 addresses layers 1 (physical layer) and 2 (data link layer).
