= HP Media Vault =

Line of home printer and file servers

- Manufacturer: Hewlett-Packard
- Type: Home server
- Processor: Broadcom BCM4785
- Frequency: 300 MHz
- Memory: 64 MB
- Ports: Gigabit Ethernet; USB 2.0 (1 front, 2 rear)
- Power consumption: 26 W (1 hard drive); 36 W (2 hard drives)
- Dimensions: 11 cm x 24 cm x 33 cm

HP Media Vault is a line of home printer and file servers from Hewlett-Packard that run a Linux-based operating system.

== First generation ==
Model	Capacity	Internal Drive	Drive Tray
MV2010	300 GB	300 GB	Empty
MV2020	500 GB	500 GB	Empty
MV2040	1 TB	500 GB	500 GB

The Media Vault's processor is a Broadcom BCM4785 MIPS-based system-on-a-chip running Linux and BusyBox v1.00-pre2 based firmware. It has 64 megabytes of RAM, one Gigabit Ethernet interface, and three USB 2.0 ports.

The capacity of the device may be expanded using the empty drive bay which can house an off-the-shelf Serial ATA hard drive. The maximum expanded capacity of MV1 (first-generation) devices is approximately 1.2 TB due to memory limitations.

One of the advantages of the system is that if the primary drive is lost (which includes some system software which works in conjunction with the firmware) the system can be restored onto a replacement SATA hard drive using HP's nasrecovery software.

Since the device supports standard communications protocols (listed below), it can be accessed by Windows, Linux, Mac, and any other OS that supports the needed protocols.

=== Protocols ===
- CIFS
- DAAP (only by user customization)
- DLNA
- FTP
- HTTP
- NFS
- Telnet (disabled by default)

== Second generation ==
Model	Capacity	Internal Drive	Drive Tray
MV2120	500 GB	500 GB	Empty
MV5020	500 GB	500 GB	Empty
MV5140	1 TB	500 GB	500 GB
MV5150	1.5 TB	750 GB	750 GB

The second generation of the MediaVault products is powered by an ARM9 Marvell Orion processor, and has 128MB of RAM. It has 1 Gigabit network connector, and 2 USB 2.0 ports. There are 2 internal disk bays which support any off the shelf SATA hard drive up to 1TB in size.

== Support ==
Lee Devlin was the hardware architect for the HP Media Vault and he maintains an unofficial support site for the device. The site includes information on hard drive replacement, restoring a previous snapshot of your pc, photos of the device internals as well as setting up a Firefly/iTunes Experimental server amongst many other articles.

There was also a Yahoo! group that offered support.
