= RealMagic =

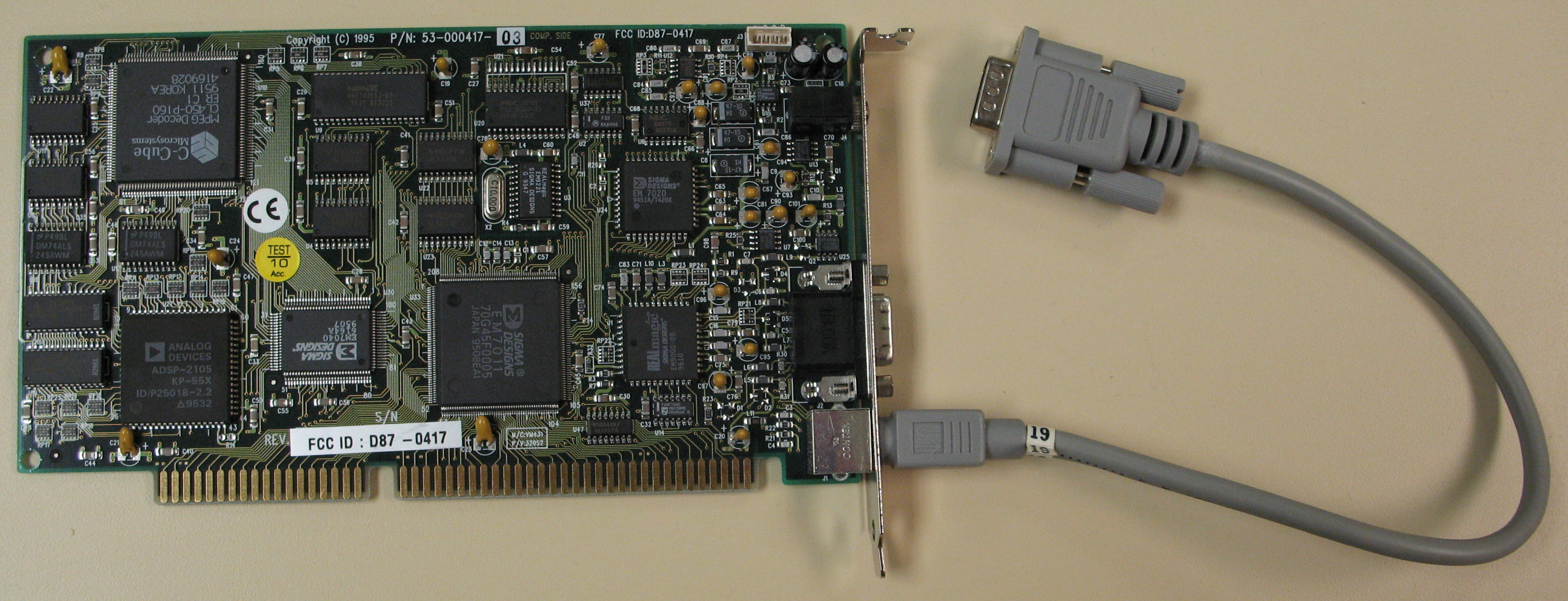
The Sigma Designs RealMagic ISA MPEG decoder card

RealMagic (or ReelMagic), from Sigma Designs, was one of the first fully compliant MPEG playback boards on the market in the mid-1990s.

RealMagic is a hardware-accelerated MPEG decoder that mixes its video stream into a computer video card's output through the video card's feature connector. It is also a SoundBlaster-compatible sound card.

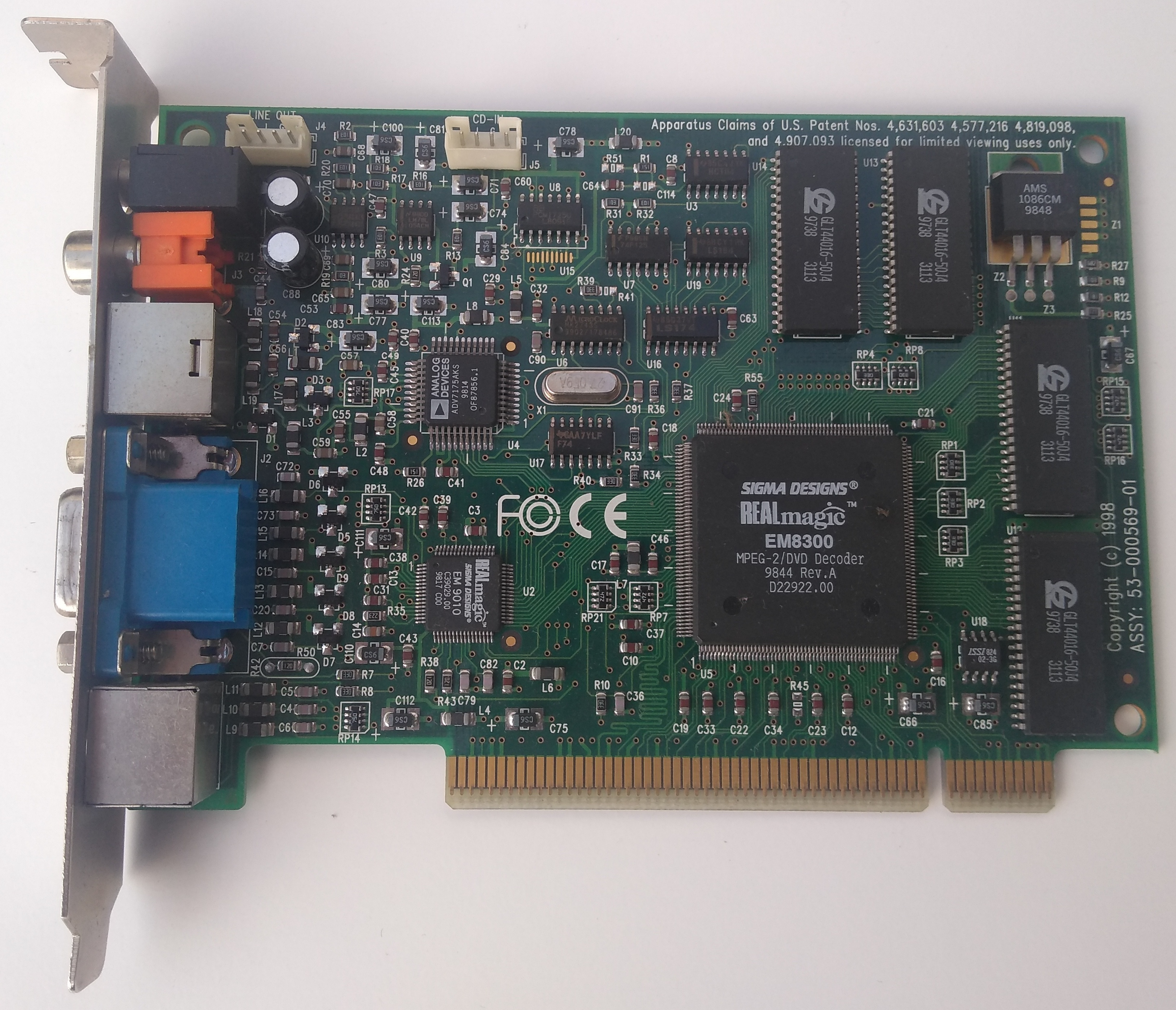
Hollywood Plus with EM8300

Sigma Design's Realmagic superseded by

- Realmagic Hollywood+
- Realmagic XCard
- Realmagic NetStream2000 - 4000

Several software companies in 1993 promised to support the card, including Access, Interplay, and Sierra. Software written for RealMagic includes:

- Under a Killing Moon
- Gabriel Knight
- Return to Cyber City
- King's Quest VI
- Dragon's Lair
- Police Quest IV
- Return to Zork
- J.R.R. Tolkien's The Lord of the Rings, Vol. I

The above titles were on a REELMAGIC demo CD that came with the hardware. The CD also contained corporate promotion videos, training videos, and news footage of John F. Kennedy and the Apollo Moon mission. Also included in the bundle was a complete version of The Horde, published by Crystal Dynamics in 1994. Another compatible game, released separately, was Merit Software's The Psychotron.
