= MaxLinear =

American hardware company

MaxLinear, Inc.
- Company type: Public
- Traded as: NYSE: MXL; S&P 600 component
- Industry: Electronics
- Founded: 2003; 23 years ago
- Founders: Kishore Seendripu; Curtis Ling
- Headquarters: Carlsbad, California, U.S.
- Key people: Kishore Seendripu (Chair and CEO); Curtis Ling (CTO)
- Products: Broadband mixed-signal semiconductors
- Revenue: ▲US$468 million (2025)
- Operating income: ▲ −US$127 million (2025)
- Net income: ▲ −US$137 million (2025)
- Total assets: ▼US$796 million (2025)
- Total equity: ▼US$452 million (2025)
- Number of employees: 1,115 (2025)
- Website: maxlinear.com

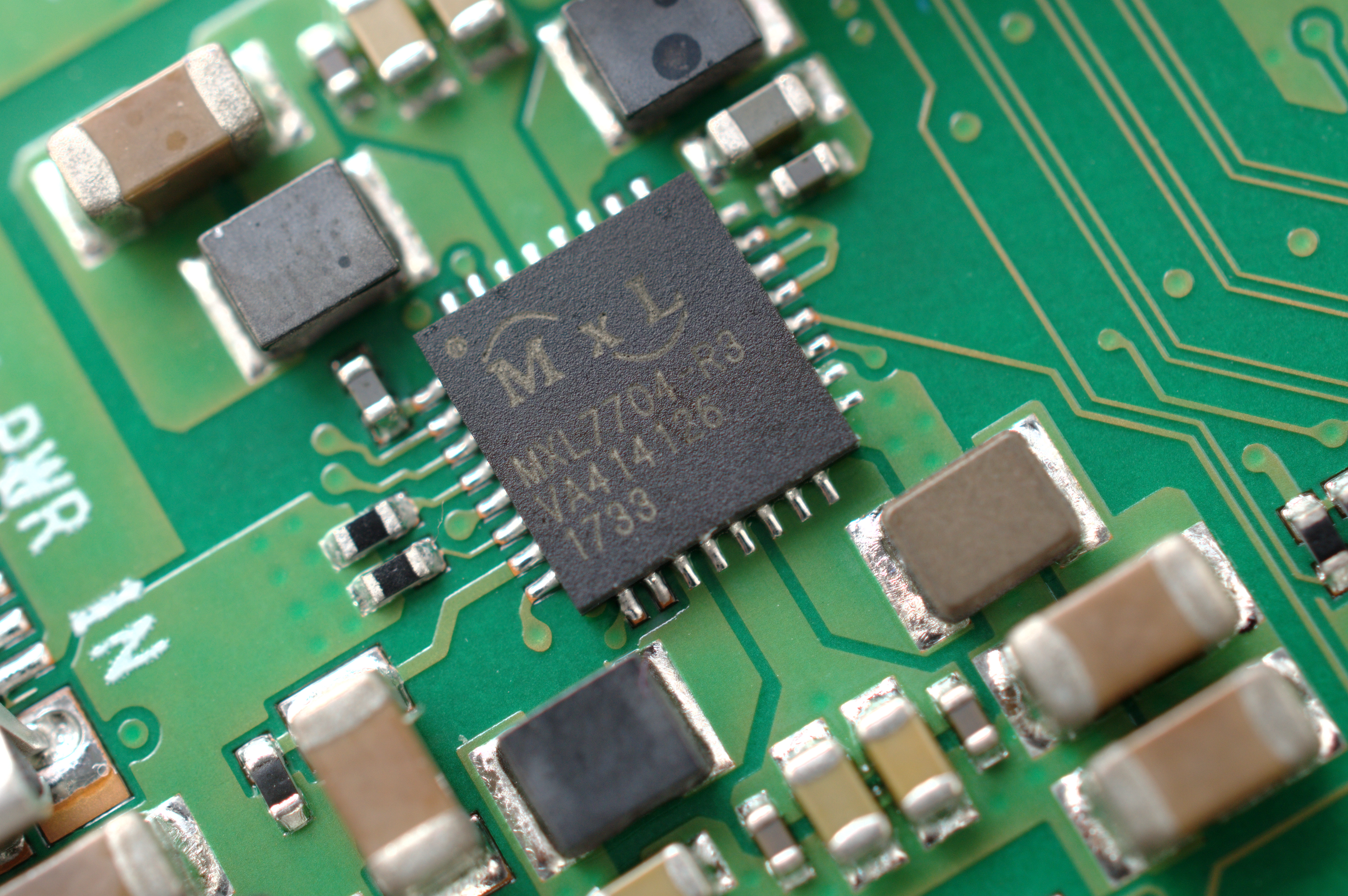
A PMIC from MaxLinear at a Raspberry Pi Model 3 B+

MaxLinear, Inc. is an American electronic hardware company. Founded in 2003, it provides highly integrated radio-frequency (RF) analog and mixed-signal semiconductor products for broadband communications applications. It is a New York Stock Exchange-traded company.

== History ==
=== Founding and growth ===
MaxLinear was founded in 2003 in Carlsbad, California by "eight semiconductor industry veterans." Kishore Seendripu was co-founder, and would become chairman, president, and chief executive. Among other companies, in the past Seendripu had worked on the technical staff at Broadcom. Prior to 2009, the majority of the company's revenue was from the sale of its "mobile handset digital television receivers" which contained MaxLinear's digital television RF receiver chips, in Japan. The biggest customers for the product were Panasonic, Murata, and MTC Co. However, in 2009, the company sold more chips for use in digital set top boxes in Europe, automotive navigation displays, and digital TVs. In 2009, the company shipped 75 million chips to companies such as Panasonic and Sony, with 99 percent of its sales in Asia.

In November 2009, MaxLinear announced it intended to go public. At the time of the IPO, MaxLinear’s venture investors included Mission Ventures in San Diego, U.S. Venture Partners, Battery Ventures and UMC Capital. MaxLinear raised around $35 million in venture capital prior to the IPO, spending around half of it. By the end of 2009, the company had $17.9 million in cash. That year, MaxLinear had $51.4 million in revenue and $4.3 million in profit.

=== IPO ===
The company held an initial public offering on March 24, 2010 on the New York Stock Exchange (NYSE) under the ticker symbol MXL. Initially the company expected to raise around $43 million with the IPO, with that projection later raised to $90 million after a last-minute increase in share price by the company. According to the San Diego Union-Tribune, "shares soared 34 percent on their debut. MaxLinear collected about $92 million from the offering, with its shares opening at $14 and peaking at $18.70 on the first day of trading." After the debut, MaxLinear said it planned to use the proceeds for "general corporate purposes," and perhaps for acquiring competitor businesses or products.

=== Post-IPO ===
By May 2010, the company employed 135 people. In May 2015, MaxLinear acquired Entropic Communications. In April 2016, MaxLinear bought Microsemi's wireless backhaul business, adding about 30 workers to its workforce. In May 2016, MaxLinear announced it would buy Broadcom's "wireless backhaul infrastructure for $80 million in cash." In the Broadcom deal, MaxLinear took on about 120 additional employees. On February 8, 2017, MaxLinear announced the acquisition of Marvell Technology Group's G.hn business, for $21.0 million in cash. On March 29, 2017, MaxLinear Inc. announced it would buy Exar Corporation for about $661.6 million cash. The acquisition of Exar Corp for $687 million was completed in May 2017.

It acquired Intel’s Home Gateway Platform Division (formerly Lantiq) in 2020.

In 2020 the company acquired NanoSemi for its machine learning techniques to improve signal integrity and power efficiency in communication and artificial intelligence systems.

As of 2022, MaxLinear is on the Multimedia over Coax Alliance board of directors as well as Arris, Broadcom, Comcast, Cox Communications, DirecTV, Echostar, Intel, and Verizon.

In May 2022, MaxLinear agreed to buy Silicon Motion, an American-Taiwanese company that develops NAND flash controllers, for $3.8 billion in a cash-and-stock deal. In July 2023, it scrapped the acquisition citing that Silicon Motion had failed to complete some of the acquisition closing conditions and suffered a "material adverse effect".

== Locations ==
MaxLinear is based in Carlsbad, California, and operates in the United States, Austria, China, Israel, India, Japan, Korea, and Spain. A "fabless" company, it uses outside chipmaking facilities, known as foundries or fabs, to manufacture its chips. By 2010, it used "third-party contractors in Asia for manufacturing and assembly," with all its chips made by United Microelectronics Corporation (UMC) at foundries in Taiwan and Singapore.

== Products ==
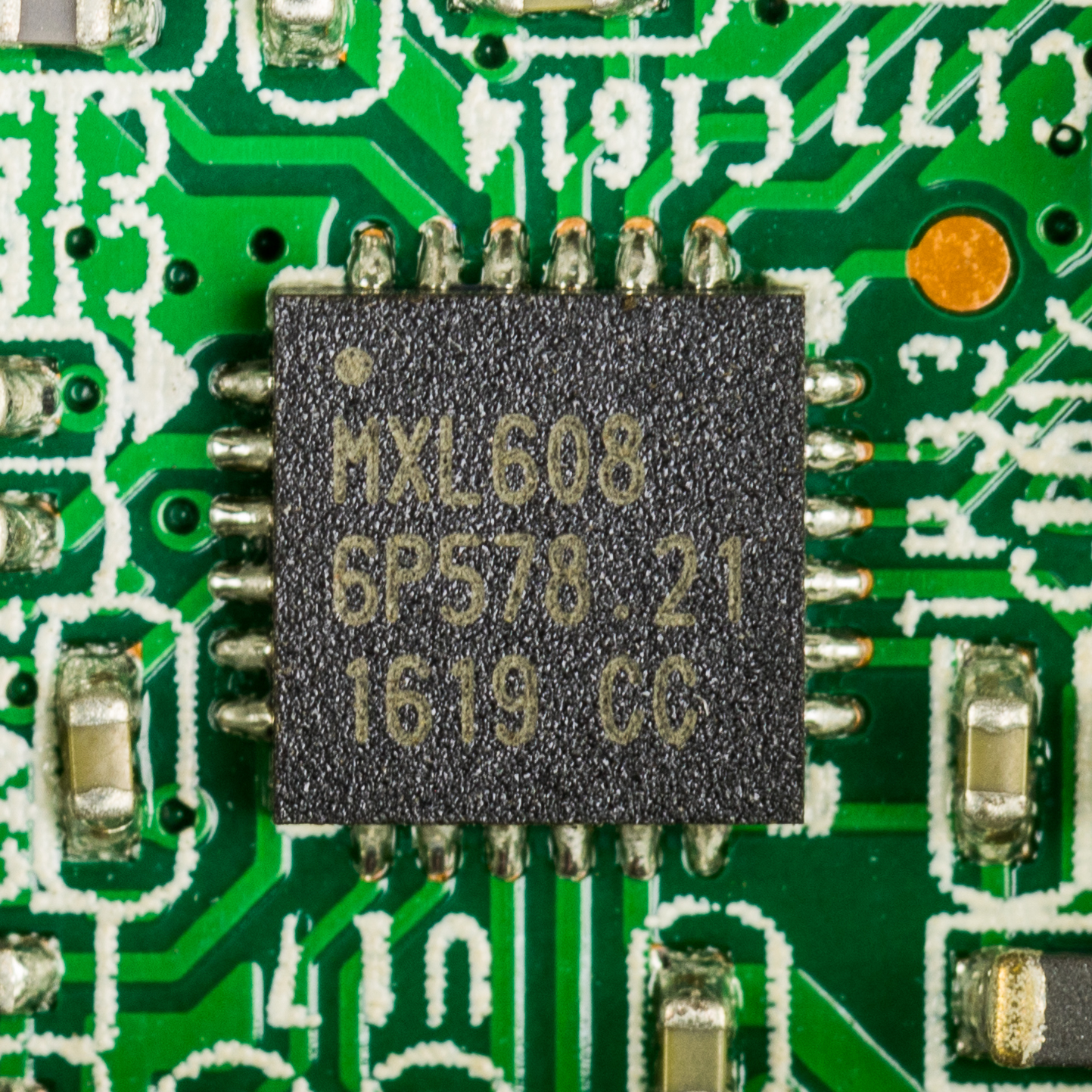
MaxLinear MXL608 - Digital Cable and Terrestrial Silicon Tuner

MaxLinear sells its products to original equipment manufacturers (OEMs), module makers and original design manufacturers (ODMs). The San Diego Union-Tribune writes that "MaxLinear’s product is very small radio-frequency TV tuner chips — half the size of an individual dial button on the keypad of a cell phone." According to Xconomy, "MaxLinear focuses on designing semiconductor chips that enable people to watch TV on devices with a wireless broadband connection." The "tiny chips" are further described as "high-performance radio frequency (RF) systems-on-a-chip for receiving and processing digital TV broadcasts, digital videos, and broadband data downloads," in order to "enable people to watch TV on a handheld wireless device."

San Diego Union-Tribune writes that the company aims to "take over from bulky 'can' tuners in TVs and other electronics. It plans to get its chips into computers, set-top boxes, mobile phones and in-vehicle video systems." Most of its customers were in Europe and Japan as of 2010, where the chips are used in "analog-to-digital set-top boxes." They are also used in televisions, mobile phones, computers, terrestrial digital and cable set-top boxes, car video systems, DOCSIS 3.0 voice and data cable modems, digital televisions, and netbooks. The company designs its analog and mixed-signal circuits in standard CMOS process technology for low-cost manufacturing.

=== Collaborations ===
In April 2013, SES S.A. announced the development by Inverto, Abilis and MaxLinear Inc of a prototype Sat-IP LNB (IP-LNB), which was demonstrated at a conference held at SES' headquarters in Luxembourg. The IP-LNB incorporates eight-channel satellite-to-IP bridging technology to deliver eight concurrent channels via IP unicast or multicast to fixed and portable client devices. As of July 2012, the prototype IP-LNB was being developed into a commercial product.

== See also ==
- Notable corporate headquarters in Carlsbad, California
- Semiconductor consolidation
