= Devolo =

Devolo AG
- Website: www.devolo.global

Devolo AG is a technology company founded on 1 May 2002 in Aachen, Germany, and specializes in the development of communications devices for private consumers and industrial applications. Its product range includes home-networking solutions mainly using the existing electrical wiring for data transmission, based on Powerline Communications (PLC).

The current range of consumer products is based on the PLC standard G.hn, older products were based on HomePlug AV. The consumer products are available as PLC or hybrid PLC/WiFi variants and can be purchased in retail stores as well as online. Moreover, devolo is an OEM supplier for international telecommunications companies. Additional to home networking, devolo develops data communications devices for industrial use, e.g. in the smart grid.

Moreover, the company regularly collaborates in publicly funded projects. devolo is a member of several industry associations, e.g. the Homegrid Forum, the G3-PLC Alliance or the German BITKOM.

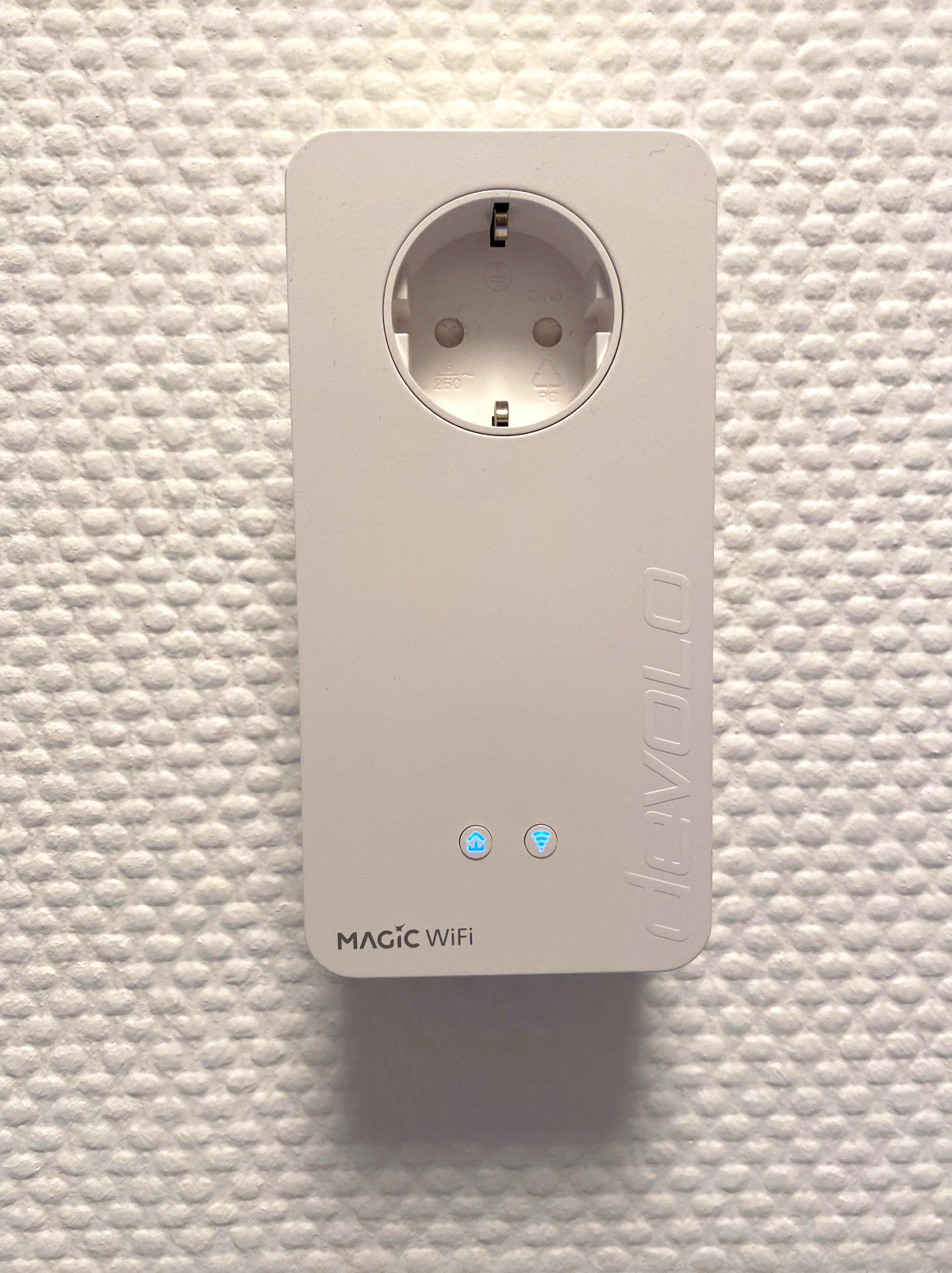
Devolo Magic Wifi Adaptor

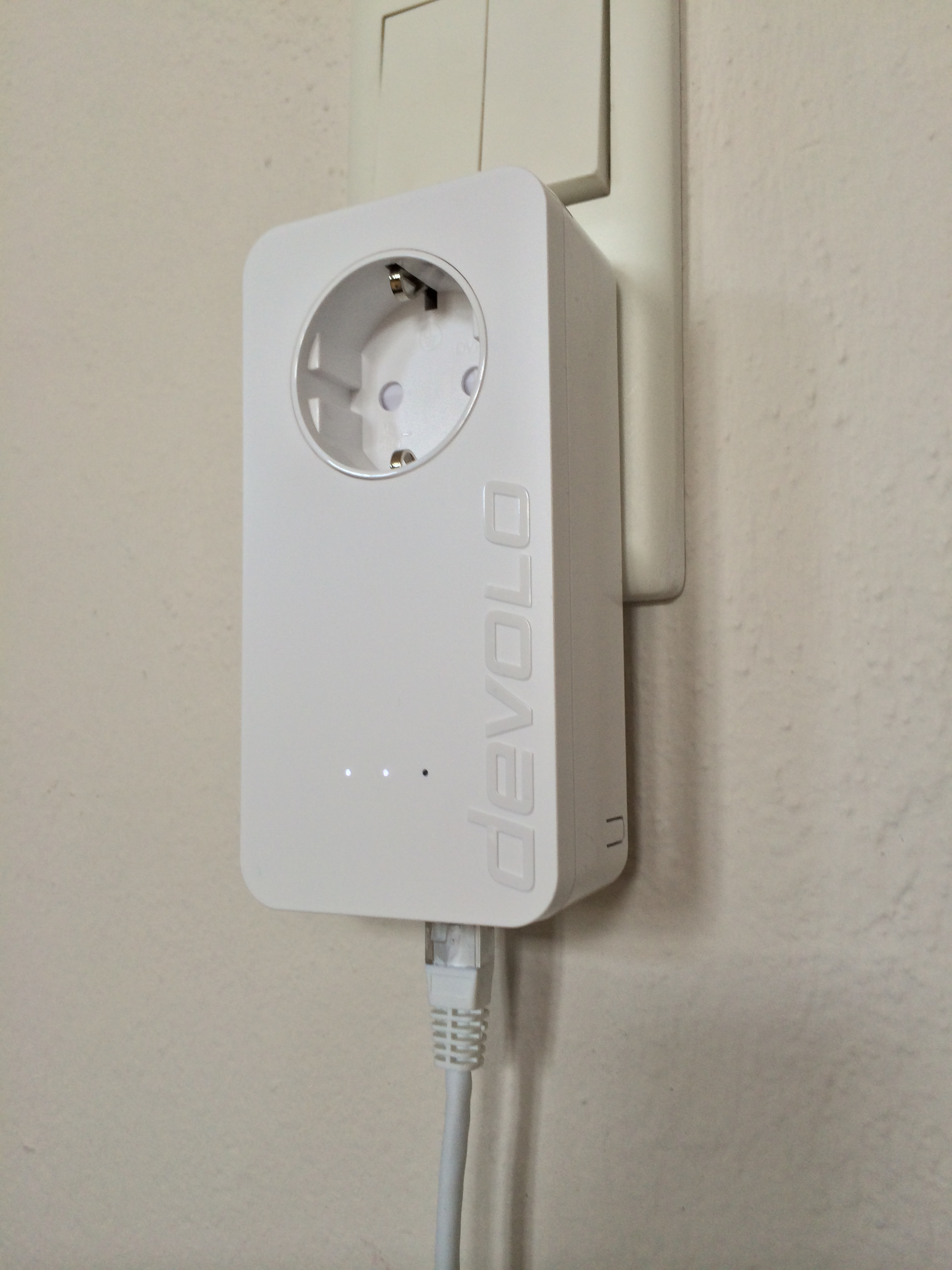
dLAN650, contemporary PLC adaptor from devolo with additional power connector and a transfer rate of up to 600 Mbit/s – with connected LAN cable

== See also ==
- G.hn
- HomePlug Powerline Alliance
- IEEE P1901
- Power line communication
