= G.hn =

Home networking over legacy wiring

ITU-T home networking recommendations
Common name	Recommendations
HomePNA 2.0	G.9951, G.9952, G.9953
HomePNA 3.0	G.9954 (02/05)
HomePNA 3.1	G.9954 (01/07)
G.hn	G.9960, G.9961
G.hn-management	G.9962
G.hn-mimo	G.9963
G.hn-psd	G.9964
G.vlc	G.9991
G.cx	G.9972
G.hnta	G.9970
G.dpm	G.9977
G.sa	G.9978
G.cwmp (TR-069)	G.9980

Gigabit Home Networking (G.hn) is a specification for wired home networking that supports speeds up to 2 Gbit/s and operates over four types of legacy wires: telephone wiring, coaxial cables, power lines and plastic optical fiber. Some benefits of a multi-wire standard are lower equipment development costs and lower deployment costs for service providers (by allowing customer self-install).

== History ==
G.hn was developed under the International Telecommunication Union's Telecommunication Standardization sector (the ITU-T) and promoted by the HomeGrid Forum and several other organizations. ITU-T Recommendation (the ITU's term for standard) G.9960, which received approval on October 9, 2009, specified the physical layers and the architecture of G.hn. The Data Link Layer (Recommendation G.9961) was approved on June 11, 2010.

Prominent organizations, including CEPca, HomePNA, and UPA, who were creators of some of these interfaces, rallied behind the latest version of the standard, emphasizing its potential and significance in the home networking domain. Moreover, the ITU-T extended the technology with multiple input, multiple output (MIMO) technology to increase data rates and signaling distance. This new feature was approved in March 2012 under G.9963 Recommendation.

The development and promotion of G.hn have been significantly supported by the HomeGrid Forum and several other organizations. The technology was not only designed to address home-networking challenges but also found applications beyond this initial scope, showcasing its versatility and potential in the networking domain.

== Technical specifications ==
=== Technical overview ===
G.hn specifies a single physical layer based on fast Fourier transform (FFT) orthogonal frequency-division multiplexing (OFDM) modulation and low-density parity-check code (LDPC) forward error correction (FEC) code. G.hn includes the capability to notch specific frequency bands to avoid interference with amateur radio bands and other licensed radio services. G.hn includes mechanisms to avoid interference with legacy home networking technologies and also with other wireline systems such as VDSL2 or other types of DSL used to access the home.

OFDM systems split the transmitted signal into multiple orthogonal sub-carriers. In G.hn each one of the sub-carriers is modulated using QAM. The maximum QAM constellation supported by G.hn is 4096-QAM (12-bit QAM).

The G.hn media access control is based on a time division multiple access (TDMA) architecture, in which a "domain master" schedules Transmission Opportunities (TXOPs) that can be used by one or more devices in the "domain". There are two types of TXOPs:

- Contention-Free Transmission Opportunities (CFTXOP), which have a fixed duration and are allocated to a specific pair of transmitter and receiver. CFTXOP are used for implementing TDMA Channel Access for specific applications that require quality of service (QoS) guarantees.
- Shared Transmission Opportunities (STXOP), which are shared among multiple devices in the network. STXOP are divided into Time Slots (TS). There are two types of TS:
  - Contention-Free Time Slots (CFTS), which are used for implementing "implicit" token passing Channel Access. In G.hn, a series of consecutive CFTS is allocated to a number of devices. The allocation is performed by the "domain master" and broadcast to all nodes in the network. There are pre-defined rules that specify which device can transmit after another device has finished using the channel. As all devices know "who is next", there is no need to explicitly send a "token" between devices. The process of "passing the token" is implicit and ensures that there are no collisions during Channel access.
  - Contention-Based Time Slots (CBTS), which are used for implementing CSMA/CARP Channel Access. In general, CSMA systems cannot completely avoid collisions, so CBTS are only useful for applications that do not have strict Quality of Service requirements.

==== Optimization for each medium ====
Although most elements of G.hn are common for all three media supported by the standard (power lines, phone lines and coaxial cable), G.hn includes media-specific optimizations for each media. Some of these media-specific parameters include:

- OFDM Carrier Spacing: 195.31 kHz in coaxial, 48.82 kHz in phone lines, 24.41 kHz in power lines.
- FEC Rates: G.hn's FEC can operate with code rates 1/2, 2/3, 5/6, 16/18 and 20/21. Although these rates are not media specific, it is expected that the higher code rates will be used in cleaner media (such as coaxial) while the lower code rates will be used in noisy environments such as power lines.
- Automatic repeat request (ARQ) mechanisms: G.hn supports operation both with and without ARQ (re-transmission). Although this is not media specific, it is expected that ARQ-less operation is sometimes appropriate for cleaner media (such as coaxial) while ARQ operation is appropriate for noisy environments such as power lines.
- Power levels and frequency bands: G.hn defines different power masks for each medium.
- MIMO support: Recommendation G.9963 includes provisions for transmitting G.hn signals over multiple AC wires (phase, neutral, ground), if they are physically available. In July 2016, G.9963 was updated to include MIMO support over twisted pairs.

==== Security ====
G.hn uses the Advanced Encryption Standard (AES) encryption algorithm (with a 128-bit key length) using the CCMP protocol to ensure confidentiality and message integrity. Authentication and key exchange is done following ITU-T Recommendation X.1035.

G.hn specifies point-to-point security inside a domain, which means that each pair of transmitter and receiver uses a unique encryption key which is not shared by other devices in the same domain. For example, if node Alice sends data to node Bob, node Eve (in the same domain as Alice and Bob) will not be able to easily eavesdrop their communication.

G.hn supports the concept of relays, in which one device can receive a message from one node and deliver it to another node farther away in the same domain. Relaying becomes critical for applications with complex network topologies that need to cover large distances, such as those found in industrial or utility applications. While a relay can read the source and target addresses, it cannot read the message's content due to its body being end-to-end-encrypted.

==== Profiles ====
The G.hn architecture includes the concept of profiles. Profiles are intended to address G.hn nodes with significantly different levels of complexity. In G.hn the higher complexity profiles are proper supersets of lower complexity profiles, so that devices based on different profiles can interoperate with each other.

Examples of G.hn devices based on high complexity profiles are Residential Gateways or Set-Top Boxes. Examples of G.hn devices based on low complexity profiles are home automation, home security and smart grid devices.

==== Technical parameters ====
The chart depicts a summary of the crucial technical specifications of the G.hn standard. Many of these technical elements are consistent across different physical media, with variations seen in areas such as Tone Spacing and frequency ranges. This uniformity is essential as it allows silicon manufacturers to produce a singular chip capable of implementing all three media types, leading to cost savings. Presently, G.hn chipsets are compatible with all three media types. This compatibility allows system manufacturers to create devices that can adjust to any wiring type simply by modifying a software configuration in the equipment.

=== Spectrum ===
The G.hn spectrum depends on the medium as shown in the diagram below:

=== Protocol stack ===
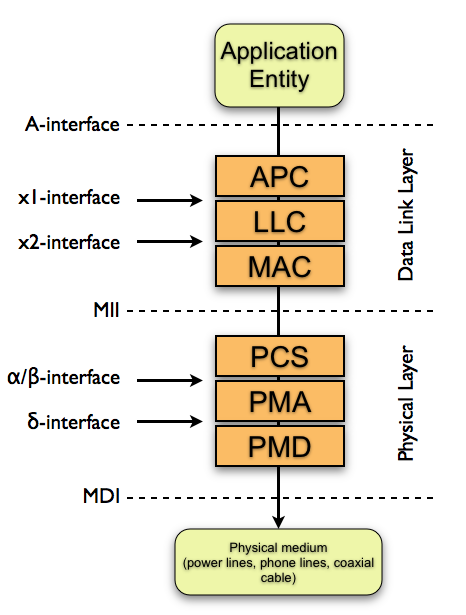
G.hn protocol stack

G.hn specifies the physical layer and the data link layer, according to the OSI model.

- The G.hn Data Link Layer (Recommendation G.9961) is divided into three sub-layers:
  - The Application Protocol Convergence (APC) Layer, which accepts frames (usually in Ethernet format) from the upper layer (Application Entity) and encapsulates them into G.hn APC protocol data units (APDUs). The maximum payload of each APDU is 2^{14} bytes.
  - The logical link control (LLC), which is responsible for encryption, aggregation, segmentation and automatic repeat-request. This sub-layer is also responsible for "relaying" of APDUs between nodes that may not be able to communicate through a direct connection.
  - The medium access control (MAC), which schedules channel access.
- The G.hn physical layer (Recommendation G.9960) is divided into three sub-layers:
  - The Physical Coding Sub-layer (PCS), responsible for generating PHY headers.
  - The Physical Medium Attachment (PMA), responsible for scrambling and forward error correction coding/decoding.
  - The Physical Medium Dependent (PMD), responsible for bit-loading and OFDM modulation.

The interface between the Application Entity and the Data Link Layer is called A-interface. The interface between the Data Link Layer and the physical layer is called Medium Independent Interface (MII). The interface between the physical layer and the actual transmission medium is called Medium Dependent Interface (MDI).

== Support ==
=== HomeGrid Forum ===
The HomeGrid Forum is a non-profit trade group promoting G.hn. The Forum includes over 50 members, categorized as non-profit (primarily academic) contributors, participant service providers, promoters, adopters, and liaisons (other similar fora or associations).

=== Vendors ===
Vendors promoting G.hn include MaxLinear, ReadyLinks Inc, Lantiq, devolo AG, microchip manufacturer Intel, system-on-a-chip vendor Sigma Designs, and Xingtera, which announced a product in January 2013.

The first live public demonstration of G.hn interoperability was shown at CES, January 10–13, 2012 by Lantiq, Marvell Technology Group, Metanoia, and Sigma Designs.

=== Service providers ===
On February 26, 2009, as part of a HomePNA press release, AT&T (which makes use of wireline home networking as part of its U-Verse IPTV service) expressed support for the work developed by ITU-T creating standards for home networking, including G.hn.

Service providers like AT&T promoted G.hn for:

- Connecting to any room no matter what the wiring type may be.
- Enabling customer self-install
- Built-in diagnostic information and remote management
- Multiple silicon and equipment suppliers

Other service providers that are contributors to the ITU-T Study Group include British Telecom, Telefónica, and AT&T.

=== Equipment vendors ===
In April 2008, during the first announcement of HomeGrid Forum, Echostar, a manufacturer of set-top boxes for the service provider market, expressed its support for the unified standard:

=== Consumer electronics ===
In March 2009, Best Buy (which is the largest retailer of consumer electronics in the United States) joined the board of directors of HomeGrid Forum and expressed its support for G.hn.

Panasonic, one of the largest manufacturers of consumer electronics, is also a contributor member of HomeGrid Forum.

=== Analysts ===
In 2008, several marketing firms promoted G.hn and made optimistic predictions.

=== Other organizations ===
In July 2009, HomeGrid Forum and DLNA signed a liaison agreement "setting the stage for collaboration between the two organizations and the approval of G.hn as a DLNA-recognized Physical Layer technology".

In June 2010, Broadband Forum and HomeGrid Forum signed an agreement to deliver a compliance and interoperability testing program for products using G.hn technology. The Broadband Forum will support HomeGrid Forum's validation of G.hn products, their promotion of product conformance and interoperability, and help expedite the total time to market for HomeGrid Forum Certified products. In May 2011, both organizations jointly announced the first open G.hn plugfest.

=== Related standards ===
Relationship between G.hnta and G.hn

ITU G.9970 (also known as G.hnta) is a Recommendation developed by ITU-T that describes the generic architecture for home networks and their interfaces to the operators' broadband access networks.

ITU G.9972 (also known as G.cx) is a Recommendation developed by ITU-T that specifies a coexistence mechanism for home networking transceivers capable of operating over power line wiring. The coexistence mechanism would allow G.hn devices which implement G.9972 to coexist with other devices implementing G.9972 and operating on the same power line wiring.

ITU G.9991 (also known as G.vlc) is a Recommendation developed by ITU-T that specifies the PHY and DLL for High speed indoor visible light communication transceivers, used in applications such as Li-Fi. G.vlc reuses the PHY and DLL of G.hn, enabling the same chips to be used for both applications.

== Residential applications ==
The major motivation for wired home networking technologies was IPTV, especially when offered by a service provider as part of a triple play service, voice and data service offering such as AT&T's U-Verse. Smart grid applications like home automation or demand side management can also be targeted by G.hn-compliant devices that implement low-complexity profiles.

1. IPTV: In many customers' homes the residential gateway that provides Internet access is not located close to the IPTV set-top box. This scenario becomes very common as service providers start to offer service packages with multiple set-top boxes per subscriber. G.hn can connect the residential gateway to one or more set-top boxes, by using the existing home wiring. Using G.hn, IPTV service providers do not need to install new Ethernet wires, or 802.11 wireless networks. Because G.hn supports any kind of home wiring, end users might install the IPTV home network by themselves, thus reducing the cost to the service provider.
2. Home networks: Although Wi-Fi technology is popular for consumer home networks, G.hn is also intended for use in this application. G.hn is an adequate solution for consumers in situations in which using wireless is not needed (for example, to connect a stationary device like a TV or a network-attached storage device), or is not desired (due to security concerns) or is not feasible (for example, due to limited range of wireless signals).
3. Consumer electronics: Consumer electronics (CE) products can support Internet connectivity using technologies such as Wi-Fi, Bluetooth or Ethernet. Many products not traditionally associated with computer use (such as TVs or hi-fi equipment) provide options to connect to the Internet or to a computer using a home network to provide access to digital content. G.hn is intended to provide high-speed connectivity to CE products capable of displaying high-definition television. Integrating the power connection and the data connection provides potential energy savings in CE devices. Given that CE devices (such as home theater receivers) very often run on standby or "vampire power", they represent major savings to homeowners if their power connection is also their data connection - the device could reliably be turned off when it is not displaying any source.
4. Smart grid: Because G.hn can operate over wires including AC and DC power lines, it can provide the communication infrastructure required for smart grid applications. A comprehensive smart grid system requires reaching into every AC outlet in a home or building so that all devices can participate in energy conserving strategies. In September 2009, the US National Institute of Standards and Technology included G.hn as one of its standards for the smart grid "for which it believed there was strong stakeholder consensus", as part of an early draft of the "NIST Framework and Roadmap for Smart Grid Interoperability Standards". In January 2010 G.hn was removed from the final version of the "Standards Identified for Implementation".

== Industrial applications ==
G.hn technology facilitates the connection of devices across various network types using different wiring options, including coax, phone lines, power lines, and optical fiber. Initially designed for home networking, its applications expanded to encompass a broad spectrum of industrial scenarios.

1. Smart elevators: Contemporary elevators are equipped with numerous sensors and actuators that ideally communicate via IP. Leveraging G.hn for communication between these dispersed IP nodes can lead to significant reductions in wiring during installation.
2. Intelligent lighting systems: In the realm of smart cities, lighting systems are evolving into interactive platforms that interact with their surroundings. This might encompass nodes linked to street signage, light modulation, water monitoring, atmospheric sensors, pedestrian communication systems, vehicle charging stations, imaging units, and audio systems.
3. Airport navigation lights: Utilizing the right signal coupler allows the existing infrastructure to be repurposed with the G.hn PLC profile, simplifying the communication system setup.
4. Charging stations: Charging station networks, encompassing quick payment, user-friendly queries, operations, station oversight, and cloud-based control, can efficiently repurpose existing powerline infrastructure for data transfer.
5. Industrial facilities: G.hn components can be integrated to function alongside industrial control systems through the power bus. The employment of coaxial cables is seen as beneficial due to their durability in challenging conditions, reducing the need for protective conduits.
6. Fiber solutions for harsh conditions: G.hn access systems come with an industrial profile, allowing them to function in challenging conditions like flooding or extreme temperature fluctuations.

== See also ==
- IEEE 1901
- HD-PLC
