= HomePNA =

Home networking organization

The HomePNA Alliance (formerly the Home Phoneline Networking Alliance, also known as HPNA) is an incorporated non-profit industry association of companies that develops and standardizes technology for home networking over the existing coaxial cables and telephone wiring within homes, so new wires do not need to be installed. HomePNA creates industry specifications which it then standardizes under the International Telecommunication Union (ITU) standards body.

HomePNA was developed for entertainment applications such as IPTV which require good quality of service (QoS). HomePNA promoter companies are AT&T Inc., Technicolor SA, Pace plc, Sigma Designs, Motorola, Cisco Systems, Sunrise Telecom and K-Micro.

== History ==
HomePNA 1.0 technology was developed by Tut Systems in the 1990s. The original protocols used balanced pair telephone wire.

HomePNA 2.0 was developed by Epigram and was approved by the ITU as Recommendations G.9951, G.9952 and G.9953.

HomePNA 3.0 was developed by Broadcom (which had purchased Epigram) and Coppergate Communications and was approved by the ITU as Recommendation G.9954 in February 2005.

HomePNA 3.1 was developed by Coppergate Communications and was approved by the ITU as Recommendation G.9954 in January 2007. HomePNA 3.1 added Ethernet over coax. HomePNA 3.1 uses frequencies above those used for digital subscriber line and analog voice calls over phone wires and below those used for broadcast and direct-broadcast satellite TV over coax, so it can coexist with those services on the same wires.

In March 2009, HomePNA announced a liaison agreement with the HomeGrid Forum to promote the ITU-T G.hn wired home networking standard. In May 2013 the HomePNA alliance merged with the HomeGrid Forum.

== Technical characteristics ==
HomePNA uses frequency-division multiplexing (FDM), which uses different frequencies for voice and data on the same wires without interfering with each other. A standard phone line has enough room to support voice, high-speed DSL and a landline phone.

Two custom chips designed using the HPNA specifications were developed by Broadcom: the 4100 chip can send and receive signals over 1,000 ft (305 m) on a typical phone line. The larger 4210 controller chip strips away noise and passes data on.

A HomePNA setup would include a HomePNA card or external adapter for each computer, an external adapter, cables, and software. A low-pass filter may be needed between any phones and their respective jacks to block noise. HomePNA adapters come in PCI, USB, and PC Card formats.

== Alternatives ==
Alternatives to HomePNA include power line communication, Wi-Fi, data over cable, and multimedia over coax.

== See also ==
- IEEE 802.3 – Collection of standards for wired Ethernet
- IEEE 802.11 – Wireless network standard
- IEEE 1905 – Multi-mode network enabler for home networking
