= Home network =

Type of computer network

A home network, or home area network (HAN), is a computer network, specifically a local area network (LAN), that facilitates communication among devices within the close vicinity of a home. Devices capable of participating in this network, for example, smart devices such as network printers and handheld mobile computers, often gain enhanced emergent capabilities through their ability to interact. These additional capabilities can be used to increase the quality of life inside the home in a variety of ways, such as automation of repetitive tasks, increased personal productivity, enhanced home security, and easier access to entertainment. Other than a regular LAN that is centralized and uses Ethernet, Wi‑Fi, and Internet Protocol (IP), a home network may also make use of direct peer-to-peer methods as well as non-IP protocols such as Zigbee and Bluetooth.

== Infrastructure devices ==
Certain devices in a home network are primarily concerned with enabling or supporting the communications of the kinds of end devices residents more directly interact with. Unlike their data center counterparts, these networking devices are compact and passively cooled, aiming to be as hands-off and non-obtrusive as possible.

A gateway establishes physical and data link layer connectivity to a WAN provided by a service provider. Home routers provided by internet service providers (ISP) usually have the modem integrated within the unit. It is effectively a client of the external DHCP servers owned by the ISP.

A router establishes network layer connectivity between a wide area network (WAN) and the local area network of the residence. For IPv4 networking, the device may also perform the function of network address translation establishing a private network with a set of independent addresses for the network. These devices often contain an integrated wireless access point and a multi-port Ethernet LAN switch.

A wireless access point provides connectivity within the home network for mobile devices and many other types using the Wi-Fi standard. When a router includes this service, it is referred to as a wireless router, which is predominantly the case.

A network switch permits the connection of multiple wired Ethernet devices to the home network. While the needs of most home networks are satisfied with wireless connectivity, some devices require wired connection. Such devices, for example IP cameras and IP phones, are sometimes powered via their network cable with power over Ethernet (PoE).

A network bridge binds two different network interfaces to each other, often in order to grant a wired-only device access to a wireless network medium.

Controllers for home automation or smart home hubs act as a controller for light bulbs, smart plugs, and security devices.

== Connectivity and protocols ==
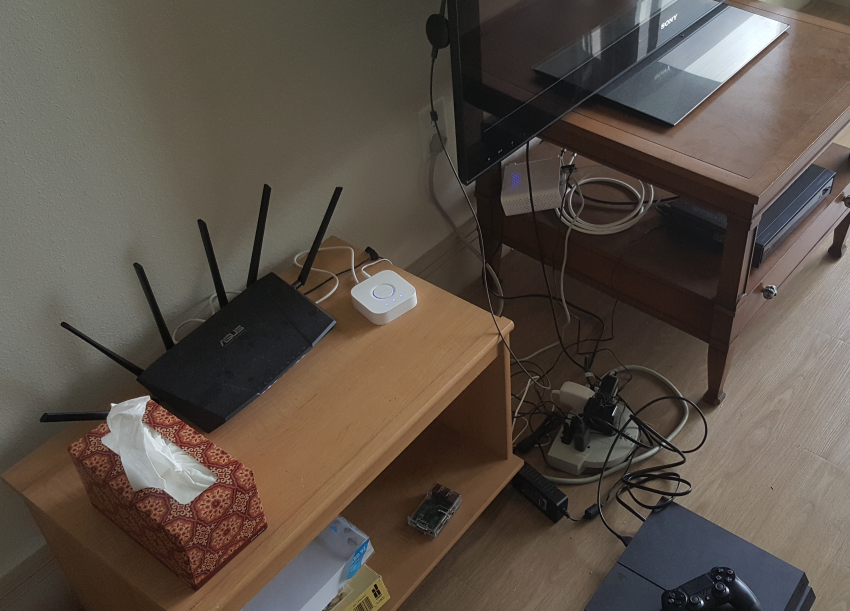
An example of a simple home network

Home networks may use either wired or wireless connectivity methods that are found and standardized on local area networks or personal area networks. One of the most common ways of creating a home network is by using Wireless radio signal technology; the 802.11 network as certified by the IEEE. Most wireless-capable residential devices operate at a frequency of 2.4 GHz under 802.11b and 802.11g or 5 GHz under 802.11a. Some home networking devices operate in both radio-band signals and fall within the 802.11n or 802.11ac standards. Wi-Fi is a marketing and compliance certification for IEEE 802.11 technologies. The Wi-Fi Alliance has tested compliant products, and certifies them for interoperability.

Low power, close range communication based on IEEE 802.15 standards has a strong presence in homes. Bluetooth continues to be the technology of choice for most wireless accessories such as keyboards, mice, headsets, and game controllers. These connections are often established in a transient, ad-hoc manner and are not thought of as permanent residents of a home network. A "low-rate" version of the original WPAN protocol was used as the basis of Zigbee.

== Endpoint devices and services ==
Home networks may consist of a variety of devices and services. Personal computers such as desktops and mobile computers like tablets and smartphones are commonly used on home networks to communicate with other devices. A network attached storage (NAS) device may be part of the network, for general storage or backup purposes. A print server can be used to share any directly connected printers with other computers on the network. A home server can be self-hosted on a home network instead of a web hosting service.

Smart speakers may be used on a network for streaming media. DLNA is a common protocol used for interoperability between networked media-centric devices in the home, allowing devices like stereo systems on the network to access the music library from a PC on the same network, for example. Using an additional Internet connection, TVs for instance may stream online video content, while video game consoles can use online multiplayer.

Traditionally, data-centric equipment such as computers and media players have been the primary tenants of a home network. However, due to the lowering cost of computing and the ubiquity of smartphone usage, many traditionally non-networked home equipment categories now include new variants capable of control or remote monitoring through an app on a smartphone. Newer startups and established home equipment manufacturers alike have begun to offer these products as part of a "Smart" or "Intelligent" or "Connected Home" portfolio. Examples of such may include "connected" light bulbs (see also Li-Fi), home security alarms and smoke detectors. These often run over the Internet so that they can be accessed remotely.

Individuals may opt to subscribe to managed cloud computing services that provide such services instead of maintaining similar facilities within their home network. In such situations, local services along with the devices maintaining them are replaced by those in an external data center and made accessible to the home-dweller's computing devices via a WAN Internet connection.

== Network management ==
Apple devices aim to make networking as hidden and automatic as possible, utilizing a zero-configuration networking implementation called Bonjour embedded within their line of software and hardware products.

Microsoft offers simple access control features built into their Windows operating system. Homegroup is a feature that allows shared disk access, shared printer access and shared scanner access among all computers and users (typically family members) in a home, in a similar fashion as in a small office workgroup, e.g., by means of distributed peer-to-peer networking (without a central server). Additionally, a home server may be added for increased functionality. The Windows HomeGroup feature was introduced with Microsoft Windows 7 in order to simplify file sharing in residences. All users (typically all family members), except guest accounts, may access any shared library on any computer that is connected to the home group. Passwords are not required from the family members during logon. Instead, secure file sharing is possible by means of a temporary password that is used when adding a computer to the HomeGroup.

== See also ==
- Access control
- Computer security software
- Data backup
- Encryption
- Firewall (computing)
- Home automation
- Home server
- Indoor positioning system (IPS)
- Matter
- Network security
- Smart, connected products
- Software update
- Virtual assistant
