= List of network buses =

List of single collision domain electronic communication bus systems

List of electrical characteristics of single collision domain segment "slow speed" network buses:

Name	Multidrop	Max nodes	Electrical type	Cable type	Max bitrate [kbit/s]	Length at max bitrate	Max length [m]	Bitrate at max length
RS-485 (UART based)	Y	256	Differential	Twisted pair	1000 kbit/s		1330 m	64 kbit/s
SCSI-1/2	Y	8	Open collector	Ribbon cable	20 000 kbit/s	3 m	6 m	5 Mbit/s/ch
SCSI Ultra2	Y	16	Differential	Ribbon cable with twisted pairs	40 000 kbit/s	12 m		
LIN	Y	16	Open collector	open collector with pull-up to 12V car supply	19.2 kbit/s	40 m		
SIOX	Y	62			19.2 kbit/s			
I²C	Y	127 or 1023	Open collector		5000 kbit/s		7.6 m	
SMBus	Y	128	Open collector		100 kbit/s			
PMBus	Y	128	Open collector		400 kbit/s			
10BASE5	Y	100	Single ended	RG-8X coaxial	10 000 kbit/s	500 m	500 m	
10BASE2	Y	30	Single ended	RG-58 coaxial	10 000 kbit/s	185 m	185 m	
CAN	Y	128	ISO 11898-2 Differential	Twisted pair	20 000 kbit/s	40 m	1000 m	50 kbit/s
DMX512-A	N	32	Differential (RS-485)	Twisted pair 120 Ω	250 kbit/s	548 m	548 m (1800ft.)	250 kbit/s
DCC	Y	127	Single ended		5 kbit/s			
RS-232	N	2	Single ended		128 kbit/s	1.5 m (approx)	15 m	19.6 kbit/s
PSI5	Y			Twisted pair	189 kbit/s		12 m (approx)	
1-Wire	Y	2^{48}	Open collector	Single conductor, with ground	16.3 kbit/s		300 m	
X10	Y	256		Power line	0.05 kbit/s / 0.06 kbit/s			
FlexRay				Twisted pair	20 000 kbit/s			
SENT	N	2	Single ended	Single conductor, with 5 V power supply and ground	async. transmission, min. 39.216 kbits/s	5 m		
SPC	Y	5	Single ended or Open collector	Single conductor, with 5 V power supply and ground, shielded when using higher speeds	sync. and async. transmission, variable up to ~150 kbit/s	~0.5 m	5 m	same as SENT
I3C	Y	127	Single ended or Open drain		12 500 kbits/s			
SPI	Y		Single ended		variable up to ~10000 kbit/s (depends strongly on physical setup)			

The number of nodes can be limited by either number of available addresses or bus capacitance. None of the above use any analog domain modulation techniques like MLT-3 encoding, PAM-5 etc.

PSI5 designed with automation applications in mind is a bit unusual in that it uses Manchester code.

== See also ==
- Multidrop bus
- Characteristic impedance
- Category 5 cable
- Telegrapher's equations
- Single-ended signaling
- Network segment
- CEBus
- KNX (EIB)
