= HomeSeer =

American technology company

- Website type: Private
- Available in: English
- Founded: 1999
- Headquarters: Bedford, New Hampshire
- Area served: Worldwide
- Founder: Richard Helmke
- Industry: Home automation
- Products: Home automation software Home automation controllers Z-Wave controllers Z-Wave light switches Z-Wave water valves Z-Wave sensors
- Website: homeseer.com

HomeSeer Technologies LLC is an American technology company based in Bedford, New Hampshire, that develops home automation controllers and software. It also operates an online store for compatible products and a community forum for users and dealers.

Software is at the core of HomeSeer's systems. The HS series (HS1-HS4) is licensed as a stand-alone product for users who wish to run it on their own personal computers. Its also pre-installed onto HomeTroller controllers, for users who prefer a more fully configured solution. HS series systems are connected to the users home network and may be programmed with any web browser in a typical installation. Once programming is complete, the HS3 system will carry out automation functions unattended. If desired, the HSTouch mobile app may be used to monitor and manually control the products in the home. HomeSeer's MyHS web service is designed to provide remote internet access only and is not required for processing of automation events in the home.

== History ==
=== 1999-2004 ===
HS1 v1.7 distribution CD from 2004.

HomeSeer was founded in 1999 by Richard Helmke. Helmke created his own program, initially named AutoHome, and launched it under the company name Keware. Shortly after release, Keware was renamed HomeSeer, and AutoHome was renamed HomeSeer v1 or HS1 for short. At first, the software was compatible with X10 light switches, plug-in modules and controllers. Over time, support was added for additional products such as the ADI Ocelot, JDS Stargate controller and WGL W800 wireless receivers. An open API coupled with a freely available SDK was added to encourage 3rd party development of plug-in (drivers) for support of additional technologies and products. HS1 included support for remote internet access and voice control using Microsoft speech technology (SAPI). As sales of HS1 increased, a message board forum was implemented to provide community-based support for HS1 users.

In 2003, driver support was added to HS1 for Z-Wave, a wireless mesh network technology. At that time, the technology was in its infancy with only a handful of lighting products available from Advanced Control Technologies and Sylvania.

In 2004, HomeSeer released its first hardware product, the ZU0100-001 Z-Wave USB interface. This product functioned as a Z-Wave transceiver to allow HS1 software to communicate with wireless Z-Wave devices.

=== 2005-2010 ===
August 2005 marked the release of HS2 software. The new version was designed as a web application to allow for remote set up and configuration, as well as remote control. A professional version (HSPRO) targeting custom installers and featuring advanced Z-Wave support with pre-licensed plug-ins, was also released. In December, the company's first hardware controller (PRO-100) was released. The PRO-100 was a fan-less design with DOM storage that included an embedded installation of HSPRO software.

In 2006, HomeSeer released the Z-Troller, a handheld Z-Wave network controller that doubled as a Z-Wave interface. Since Z-Troller was both a network controller and interface, it supported advanced features such as network optimization and network backup and restore. In October, the PRO-100 was upgraded to a faster Series II model.

In 2007, HomeSeer released the HSM100, a battery operated Z-Wave 'multi-sensor' with built-in sensors for motion, temperature and light level. The HSM100 was well suited for home automation events that relied on some combination of its sensor data. HomeSeer's HomeTroller was also released in 2007 to provide functionality similar to the PRO-100 but at a lower price point. Unlike the PRO-100, the original HomeTroller was equipped with a conventional mechanical hard drive, active cooling (with fans) and embedded HS2 software. Subsequent versions were released with passive cooling (no fans) and with DOM, SD card or SSD storage to improve reliability.

In 2009, HomeSeer released its first mobile app, a software program called HSTouch. Originally developed for Apple's iOS platform, HSTouch gave HomeSeer users the ability to monitor and control their homes with their iPhones and iPods. A companion program, HSTouch Designer, was also released for those who wished to customize the mobile app with their own screen designs and graphics.

In 2010, HomeSeer released its Android version of HSTouch mobile app. In September, HomeTroller was upgraded to the S3 model.

=== 2011-2013 ===
HomeTroller-SE was in production from 2011 to 2014

In 2011, HomeSeer released the HomeTroller-SE as its new entry level controller. The -SE model featured a less powerful CPU and fewer features than the standard HomeTroller model but at approximately half the cost. An even lower cost HomeTroller-Mini was also in the works with a prototype unit debuting at CES 2011. However, the HomeTroller-Mini design was later abandoned before release because of parts availability and cost issues.

In 2013, HomeSeer released HS3, a significant upgrade to the HS2 version. HS3 included an all-new JQuery web GUI, redesigned automation 'engine', multi-network Z-Wave support and new counter and timer features. A professional version, HS3PRO, was also released to service the dealer channel.

HomeSeer's HomeTroller Zee was also released in 2013. The Zee was based on the Raspberry Pi1 model B computer, included HS3 software and was bundled with an Aeon Labs Z-Stick Z-Wave interface. HomeTroller Zee replaced the HomeTroller-SE as the company's entry level home controller.

=== 2014 ===
In January 2014, HomeSeer introduced voice programming and automatic camera support for their controllers. Voice programming allowed users to create automation events solely by voice using any Android mobile device. Automatic camera support was designed to automatically detect and configure settings for Foscam brand IP cameras. This allowed the cameras to be viewed with the HSTouch mobile app.

In March, HomeSeer released the model WFTT07 Control Pad free-standing 7" Android tabletop touchscreen embedded with their HSTouch mobile app. The unit was designed to function as a WiFi connected control portal for HomeSeer controllers.

In April, HomeSeer launched MyHomeSeer-Remote (MyHS) remote access web service for HS3. MyHS simplified the process of enabling remote access to HomeSeer systems by eliminating the need to adjust router settings or use DDNS technology. MyHS was also designed to optimize connection performance in the home by automatically providing a direct LAN connection for users attempting to access their systems on the local sub-net.

In September, HomeSeer released their HomeTroller-SEL to replace the HomeTroller-SE as the company's mid-level controller. Compared to the WindowsXP-based SE, the new SEL model included a faster CPU, twice the RAM and SSD storage, all running on a Debian distribution of Linux.

Also in September, HomeSeer released their A2Z-Link Z-Wave bridge module and the HSM200 Z-Wave multi-sensor.

- The A2Z-Link module was similar in design to the HomeTroller Zee but also included a newly developed protocol to allow other controller manufacturers to communicate with Z-Wave devices using simple JSON or ASCII commands. A2Z-Link was conceived as an OEM product; not intended for direct to consumer sales.
- The new HSM200 was line-powered, allowing the unit to function as a Z-Wave repeater. HSM200 also included an RGB LED indicator that could be controlled by HomeSeer systems to change colors when things happened in the home.

In November, the HomeTroller S6 becomes HomeSeer's new flagship home controller, replacing the PRO-100.

=== 2015 ===
In January 2015, HomeSeer released the Z-NET, an IP-enabled remote Z-Wave interface for use with its HS3-based systems. Since Z-NET works over a network connection, it can be placed nearly anywhere in the home and may also be used in outbuildings, vacation homes or other secondary residences.

In April, HomeSeer launched its IFTTT channel. IFTTT is a web service that allows users to create recipes that connect products, services and apps from more than 200 different companies around the world. The principal benefit of launching the channel is that it provides web-based integration for products, services and apps for which there are no native HomeSeer drivers (plug-ins). For example, a HomeSeer/IFTTT user could activate the ESPN sports network IFTTT channel and create a recipe to launch a HomeSeer event to turn on their TV and speak an alert when a sporting event begins.

In May, HomeSeer released its HomeTroller Zee S2 controller, based on the Raspberry Pi2 computer. Compared to the original Zee, the S2 model included a faster CPU, had twice the RAM and it included an internal Sigma 500 series Z-Wave module for native Z-Wave support. At the same time, several HomeSeer products underwent and achieved Z-Wave Plus certification. These products included HS3 software, HomeTroller Zee S2, HomeTroller-SEL, HomeTroller S6, Z-NET, SmartStick+ and A2Z-Link.

In December, HomeSeer released its Skill (app) for the Amazon Echo. The Skill allows HomeSeer users to control their systems by voice using the Amazon Echo.

=== 2016 ===
In March 2016, HomeSeer released a line of Z-Wave Plus lighting products. The line included the HS-WS100+ wall switch, HS-WD100+ wall dimmer, HS-WA100+ wall accessory (for 3-way circuits), HS-PD100+ lamp module, HS-PA100+ appliance module and HS-DTA19+ smart light bulb. In September, a Z-Wave motorized water valve was released. Model HS-WV100+ was offered in 3 valve sizes; 3/4", 1" and 1.25". Support for Amazon's Alexa technology was also added to allow Alexa devices to control HomeSeer system devices and events.

=== 2017 ===
In 2017, HomeSeer released three battery operated Z-Wave sensors. HS-DS100+ (door/window sensor) was released in January and HS-MS100+ (PIR sensor) and HS-LS100+ (water sensor) were both released in December. Support for Google Home was also added to allow Google Home devices to control HomeSeer system devices and events. In May, Z-Flash was released as a commercial software tool, designed to update firmware in Z-Wave products.

=== 2024 ===
On February 26, 2024, HomeSeer announced via its blog that as of March 12, 2024, they would be making changes to their MyHS service which would require a paid subscription to enable integration with Alexa, Google Home and IFTTT cloud connected services.

== Compatible technologies and products ==
HomeSeer systems are designed to integrate with the following technologies and products using a mixture of native and 3rd-party drivers (plug-ins):

=== Compatible technologies ===
- Z-Wave, open standard
- Zigbee, open standard
- IFTTT
- Amazon Echo
- Google Home
- X10, an older industry standard
- Insteon, proprietary system (2005–2022)
- UPB, a proprietary software protocol developed by Powerline Control Systems
- PLCBUS, a proprietary power-line communication protocol

=== Compatible products ===
- Light switches and plug-in modules
- Thermostats
- Door locks
- Garage door controllers
- Water valves
- Security systems
- TVs, audio/video receivers and related products
- IP video cameras
- Environmental and security sensors

== Recognition, awards and reviews ==
- TechTV awards HomeSeer Best of CES for 2004 in Home Automation/Home Networking category.
- SafeSmartLiving.com awards HomeSeer 3rd place in list of Best Smart Home technologies in 2014.
- AllHomeRobotics.com names HomeSeer HomeTroller-SEL "the power-user’s favorite" in 2015.
- Inc. nameed HomeSeer one of 10 Amazing Home Automation Companies You Need to Know in 2015.
- The Huffington Post names HomeSeer one of Top 18 Home Automation Companies Who Will Run Your Home in 2015.
- University Chronicle names HomeSeer as one of the key market players in home automation in 2015.
- TheWireCutter.com ranked HomeSeer HS-WD100+ as the Best Z-Wave In-Wall Dimmer in 2017.
- ASecureLife.com includes HomeSeer in list of Best Home Automation Systems in 2019.
- TopTenReviews.com ranks HomeSeer #1 (Gold) award winner in Home Automation Systems in 2021.
- BuildYourSmartHome.co calls HomeSeer's HomeTroller S6 The "Ferrari of Z-Wave Controllers" in 2022.
