= SIOX =

SIOX may refer to:

- Serial Input/Output eXchange an asynchronous datacommunications bus.
- Simple Interactive Object Extraction an algorithm for extracting foreground objects from color photographs.
- Silicon oxide (SiOx)
- Sistema de Ingresos de Oaxaca
