= IEC 61334 =

International standard

IEC 61334, known as Distribution automation using distribution line carrier systems, is a standard for low-speed reliable power line communications by electricity meters, water meters and SCADA. It is also known as spread frequency-shift keying (S-FSK) and was formerly known as IEC 1334 before IEC's most recent renumbering. It is actually a series of standards describing the researched physical environment of power lines, a well-adapted physical layer, a workable low-power media access layer, and a management interface. Related standards use the physical layer (e.g. Internet Protocol over S-FSK), but not the higher layers.

The physical layer synchronizes a small packet of tones to the zero-crossing of the power line's voltage. The tones are chosen by utilities, not specified in the standard. Tones are usually between 20 kHz and 100 kHz, and should be separated by at least 10 kHz to prevent cross talk. One tone is chosen for mark (i.e. a binary 1), and the other for space (i.e. 0). The standard permits each zero-crossing to convey 1, 2, 4 or 8 bits, with increased sensitivity to timing as the number of bits increases. In multiphase power lines, a separate signal might be sent on each phase to speed up the transmission.

The standard's low speed is caused by the limited number of bits per power line cycle. The speed is also limited by noise, and the local jitter of the AC line's zero crossing. The high reliability comes from its reliable timing system (i.e. zero crossing), high signal to noise ratio (frequencies are chosen to avoid common power line noise), lack of intermodulation distortion, and adaptive signal detection.

The most significant bits are sent first, unlike a conventional serial port. The data from zero crossings should be collected into 8-bit bytes. Each byte is collected into 42-byte packets. The first four bytes of each packet are a preamble to measure the channel's current condition. This is followed by 38 bytes of data, and 3 byte-times of silence.

S-FSK centers tones around the time when the AC line passes through zero voltage. In this way, the tones avoid most radio-frequency noise from arcing. (It is common for dirty insulators to arc at the highest point of the voltage, and thus generate a wide-band burst of noise.) Since tone pairs are chosen by utilities, different districts can use different tone pairs to avoid interference.

To avoid other interference, receivers can improve their signal-to-noise ratio by adapting their decoder. The silence and the preamble allow the receiver's signal processing to measure the channel's noise ratios. Depending on the signal to noise ratios, the bits can be recovered from the difference between the power of the mark and space tones, the power of the mark tones only, or the space tones only. The system should be able to adjust the receiving method on each 42-byte packet.

Bit timing is typically recovered from the boundaries of tones, much like a UART that is triggered by a start bit. Timing is roughly centered on the zero crossing with a timer from the previous zero crossing that can enable the bit detection. Practical bit timing cannot be derived from the zero crossing alone, due to local jitter and noise in the zero crossing caused by varying local loads on the grid.

The bytes from the low-layer packets are reformed into bytes for the higher layers. The higher link-layer strongly resembles HDLC, except with a novel feature that allows selected stations to retransmit messages. The management interface layer provides remote control of a station's protocol layers, including diagnostics and configuration. For example, it lets a central controller read a unit's signal to noise ratios, and set the bit that enables a station to retransmit weak stations.

The protocol layers are designed to integrate with any application layer, but the presence of a management interface suggests a design targeted to DLMS/COSEM, a widely used EU standard for the application layer of meters and SCADA. DLMS/COSEM requires a management interface.

== Spread frequency-shift keying ==
S-FSK (spread frequency-shift keying) is a modulation scheme that combines some of the advantages of classical spread-spectrum modulation (immunity against narrow-band interference) with some of the advantages of classical frequency-shift keying (FSK is low complexity). The difference between S-FSK and classical FSK is that in S-FSK, the mark frequency $f_m$ is placed far from the space frequency $f_s$. The frequencies are placed far enough apart that frequency-selective fading and narrow-band interference only blocks one of the frequencies, so the receiver can still recover all the data from the other frequency.

== List of IEC 61334 parts ==
- IEC TR 61334-1-1:1995 General considerations – Distribution automation system architecture
- IEC TR 61334-1-2:1997 General considerations – Guide for specification
- IEC TR 61334-1-4:1995 General considerations – Identification of data transmission parameters concerning medium and low-voltage distribution mains
- IEC 61334-3-1:1998 Mains signalling requirements – Frequency bands and output levels
- IEC 61334-3-21:1996 Mains signalling requirements – MV phase-to-phase isolated capacitive coupling device
- IEC 61334-3-22:2001 Mains signalling requirements – MV phase-to-earth and screen-to-earth intrusive coupling devices
- IEC 61334-4-1:1996 Data communication protocols – Reference model of the communication system
- IEC 61334-4-32:1996 Data communication protocols – Section 32: Data link layer – Logical link control (LLC)
- IEC 61334-4-33:1998 Data communication protocols – Data link layer – Connection oriented protocol
- IEC 61334-4-41:1996 Data communication protocols – Application protocols – Distribution line message specification
- IEC 61334-4-42:1996 Data communication protocols – Application protocols – Application layer
- IEC 61334-4-61:1998 Data communication protocols – Network layer – Connectionless protocol
- IEC 61334-4-511:2000 Data communication protocols – Systems management – CIASE protocol
- IEC 61334-4-512:2001 Data communication protocols – System management using profile 61334-5-1 – Management Information Base (MIB)
- IEC 61334-5-1:2001 Lower layer profiles – The spread frequency shift keying (S-FSK) profile
- IEC TS 61334-5-2:1998 Lower layer profiles – Frequency shift keying (FSK) profile
- IEC TS 61334-5-3:2001 Lower-layer profiles – Spread spectrum adaptive wideband (SS-AW) profile
- IEC TS 61334-5-4:2001 Lower layer profiles – Multi-carrier modulation (MCM) profile
- IEC TS 61334-5-5:2001 Lower layer profiles – Spread spectrum – fast frequency hopping (SS-FFH) profile
- IEC 61334-6:2000 A-XDR encoding rule

== See also ==
- Power line communication, for a survey of the topic
- Universal powerline bus, the more common shorter-ranged competitor
