= PLCBUS =

PLCBUS or PLC-BUS is a proprietary power-line communication protocol for communication between electronic devices used for home automation. It primarily uses power line wiring for signaling and control.

PLCBUS is similar to the X10 (industry standard) power line communication protocol. Though PLCBUS uses the same addressing scheme it is not compatible with X10. PLCBUS and X10 can coexist in the same power-line network and can interact with the use of bridges (like the PLCBUS 4808 device).

== History and adoption ==
PLCBUS was developed in 2002 by ATS Ltd. in Amsterdam the Netherlands. Companies like Philips, Magma and KPN have agreements with ATS Ltd. regarding PLCBUS products. Also Microsoft, IBM, KPN, Nokia, Motorola, Hewlett Packard, Dell, Siemens and Intel are said to have agreements with ATS Ltd. Philips, Nokia, Siemens and the French power company Électricité de France are member of the PLC-BUS Union Commission.

In 2005 the Chinese company Shanghai Super Smart Electronics bought the PLCBUS Technology for their home automation products. Currently the use of PLCBUS, however, is not as widespread as the X10 protocol and there is no vibrant community of PLCBUS users.

== Advantages ==
Advantages are:

- Reliable two-way communication: an ACK is being sent back to the sender module to acknowledge command
- Possibility to query the status of a module (for example to determine if a device is switched on or what the dim level of a light is)
- Possibility to monitor the noise and signal levels per module
- Fast: the time between the sending of a command and the retuning of an ACK is ~500 ms
- Scalability: up to 64000 modules can be addressed. An address consists of a user code, house code and unit code to uniquely identify a module. The large number of addressable modules greatly decreases the chance of unwanted interactions with PLCBUS modules of neighbors, eliminating the need of filters.

== Disadvantages ==
- The normal PLCBUS switches can only switch local appliances. Special scene controller switches are needed to switch appliances remotely.

== Typical devices ==
An appliance switch is used to both locally switch a device on/off andremote (from a scene controller or computer interface for example). Special micro modules are available that can be installed behind switches. Existing on/off switches or momentary (normal-open) switches can be used in conjunction with those micro modules. Also available are plugin appliance switches which don't have to be built-in and which can also be operated locally or remote.

A light dimmer is used to set a lights’ lightlevel both locally and remote (from a scene controller or computer interface for example). Special micro modules are available that can be installed behind switches or in the ceiling above the light. Existing on/off switches or momentary (normal-open) switches can be used in conjunction with those micro modules. Also available are plugin light dimmers which don't have to be built-in and which can also be operated locally or remote.

A scene controller or scene switch is a switch which can operate appliances and lights remote but not locally. It can send macros to set light levels and switch appliances on or off. Scene controllers are typically used to perform activities. For example, for watching TV lights are dimmed, the window blinds are closed and the TV is turned on.

A computer interface like the PLCBUS 1141, connected to a serial RS-232 or USB port, can be used to operate appliances and lights and to read module status. Windows software is available and also Linux drivers do exist.

A bridge can be used to mix PLCBUS technology with other power-line communication technology. For example, the PLCBUS 4808 device can be used to let PLCBUS devices interoperate with X10 devices.

A phase coupler can be used to couple up to three different electrical phases. In a normal house, typically only one phase is available.
