= UPB =

UPB may refer to:

- Union of Poles in Belarus
- Universal Powerline Bus, a proprietary home automation protocol (2003)
- Universidad Pontificia Bolivariana
- University of Paderborn
- University of Pittsburgh at Bradford
- University of the Philippines Baguio
- University POLITEHNICA of Bucharest

Upb may refer to:

- Unpentbium, an unsynthesized chemical element with atomic number 152 and symbol Upb

== See also ==
- UBP (disambiguation)
