= Line trap =

High-voltage electric circuit

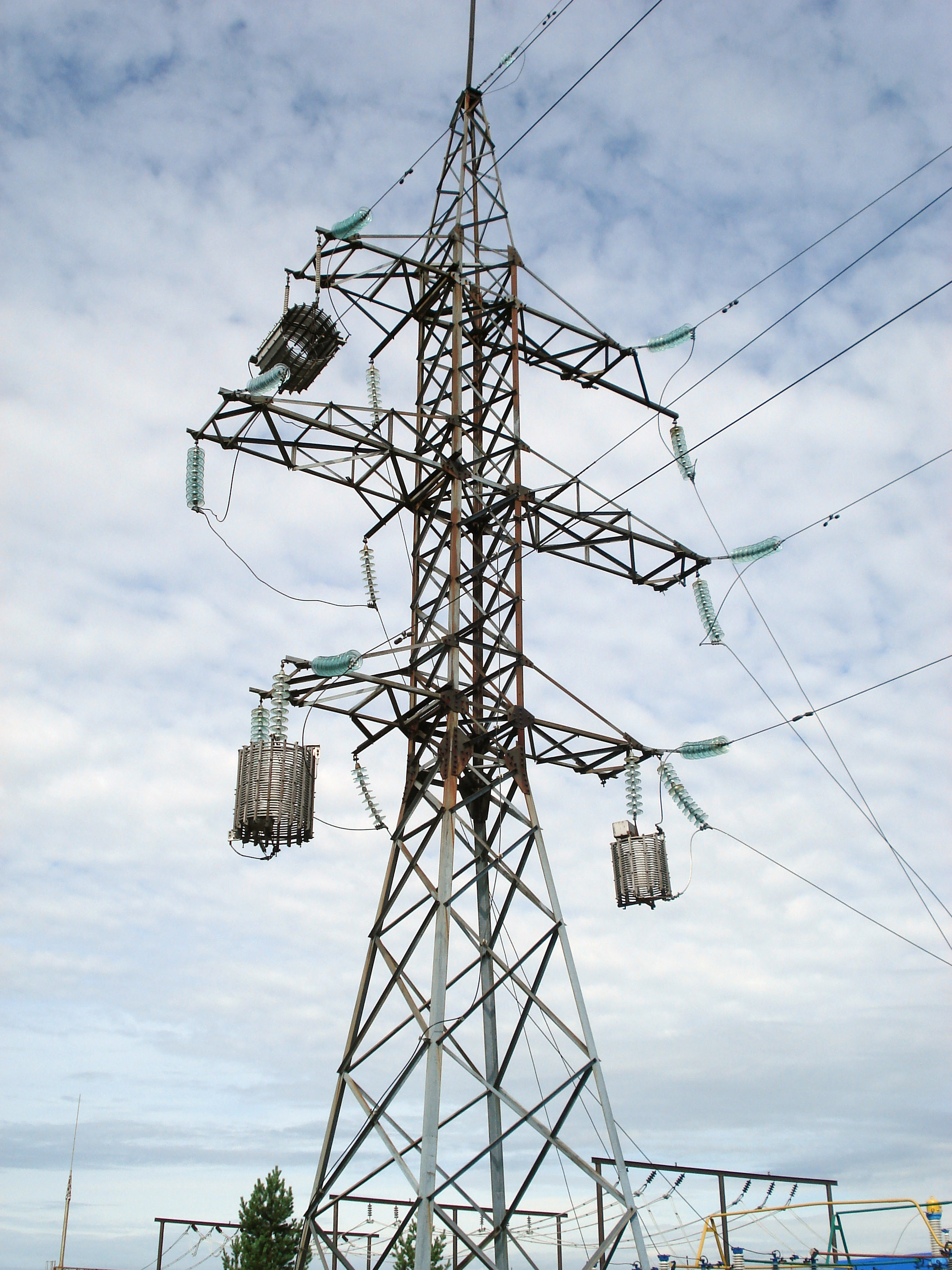
Electricity pylon with line traps

A line trap, also known as wave trap, or high-frequency stopper, is a maintenance-free parallel resonant circuit, mounted inline on high-voltage (HV) AC transmission power lines to prevent the transmission of high frequency (40 kHz to 1000 kHz) carrier signals of power line communication to unwanted destinations. Line traps are cylinder-like structures connected in series with HV transmission lines.

The line trap acts as a barrier or filter to prevent signal losses. The inductive reactance of the line trap presents a high reactance to high-frequency signals but a low reactance to mains frequency. This prevents carrier signals from being dissipated in the substation or in a tap line or branch of the main transmission path and grounds in the case of anything happening outside of the carrier transmission path. The line trap is also used to attenuate the shunting effects of high-voltage lines.

== Design ==
The trap consists of three major components: the main coil, the tuning device, and the protective device (also known as a surge arrester). The protective and tuning devices are mounted inside the main coil. A line trap may be covered with a bird barrier, in which case there are four components.

The main coil is the outer part of the line trap which is made from stranded aluminum cable. The reactor coil, depending on the device, can be made up of several aluminum wires, allowing equal distribution amongst the parallel wires. The stranded aluminum coil is wound in one layer. However, when the application of more than one layer is necessary, separation between layers is required to provide a cooling duct between them to avoid overheating. The cooling duct is created with spacer bars made out of epoxy resin and fiberglass. The coil carries rated continuous power frequency currents, therefore this is the power inductor in this system. It provides a low impedance path for the electricity flow. Since the power flow is rather large at times, the coil used in a line trap must be large in terms of physical size. Hence, a line trap unit is inserted between the busbar and connection of coupling capacitor to the line. It is a parallel tuned circuit containing inductance and capacitance. It has low impedance for power frequency and high impedance to carrier frequency. This unit prevents the high frequency carrier signal from entering the neighboring line.

The next major component is the tuning device. This device is securely installed inside the main coil. It adjusts blocking frequency or bandwidth, and consists of coils, capacitors, and resistors. This smaller coil is attached to both ends of the main coil. Its purpose is to create a blocking circuit which provides high impedance. There are three types of tuning devices: wideband tuning, single frequency tuning, and double frequency tuning. The tuned circuit is usually a dual-circuit broadband type. If the traps are self tuned, they do not require the use of any tuning devices. With the use of a tuning device, a line trap can be tuned to a frequency of 1000 Hz.

The last main component is the protective device, which is parallel with the main coil and the tuning device. It protects the main coil and the tuning device by lowering the over-voltage levels. The bandwidth of a line trap is the frequency range over which the line trap can provide a certain specified minimum blocking impedance or resistance.

Line traps are connected in series with power line and thus their coils are rated to carry the full line current. The impedance of a line trap is very low at the power frequency and will not cause any significant voltage drop.

== Use ==
Power line carrier communication (PLCC) technology has been frequently used since 1950 by the grid stations to transmit information at high speed. Transmitting information along high-voltage lines, at high frequency, has been one of the main means of communication in electric power for over fifty years. The data collected from different sensors is transmitted on power lines thereby reducing the maintenance cost of the additional wiring. In some countries, this technology is also used to provide Internet connection. In order to communicate, high-frequency line traps are used as they allow substations to communicate with each other through the power lines at the same time as they transmit electrical power. In order to separate power from messages being sent, different frequencies are used. Electrical power has a frequency of 50 Hz or 60 Hz in most places, and the communication waves use frequencies such as 150 kHz and 200 kHz. Line traps consist of filter circuits that allow only power frequency waves to travel to that of electrical equipment. They also stop communication waves from traveling to equipment.

Communication is crucial for substations.

== Limitations ==
High frequency line traps have a temperature limit of 115 °C-180 °C depending on construction and manufacture.
