= Design of Systems on Silicon =

Design of Systems on Silicon (DS2)
- Company type: Private
- Industry: Semiconductor Devices
- Founded: 1998
- Defunct: 2010
- Headquarters: Valencia, Spain
- Key people: Founder, Jorge Blasco
- Products: Power line communication Integrated circuits

Design of Systems on Silicon, officially Diseño de Sistemas en Silicio S.A., (DS2), was a supplier of integrated circuits and software for power line communications. The company was founded in 1998, and went out of business in 2010 after trying to expand into other home network technologies.

== Standards ==
DS2 developed products compliant with the 200 Mbit/s specification developed by the Universal Powerline Association (UPA). The products can be used to create a local area network, often called as a home network within a residence using existing electrical power wires.

In December 2008, DS2 announced plans to develop the DSS9960 chip, which was to be a dual-mode device interoperable both with the ITU-T G.hn standard and with the UPA specification. The UPA technology had been proposed (but not accepted) into the IEEE 1901 standard.

DS2 demonstrated their G.hn development at the Consumer Electronics Show (CES) in January 2010. Prototypes used the three medium types used by G.hn (coax, phoneline, and powerline).

== History ==
DS2 was started in 1998 at the European Innovative Companies Center (CEEI) in the Paterna Technology Park. The company reported $20 million in sales in 2008, compared to $15 million in 2007 and $12 million in 2006. It had over 140 employees in 2008.

Jorge Blasco, president and CEO of DS2, was nominated for the European Inventor of the Year Award. The European Inventor of the Year Award ceremony was held in Madrid, Spain along with the European Patent Forum in April 2010. A video at the European Patent Office explains the nomination and the invention.

On 5 March 2010, DS2 entered the Spanish equivalent of voluntary chapter 11 bankruptcy (concurso de acreedores, in Spanish). On 19 August 2010, Marvell Technology Group announced it acquired the intellectual property and assets of DS2.
