= Universal Powerline Association =

- Formation: 2004
- Dissolved: 2010
- Type: Non-profit trade group

The Universal Powerline Association (UPA) was a trade association that covered power line communication (PLC) markets and applications. The UPA promoted and certified power line communication technology from 2004 to 2010.

== History ==
An interest group for the UPA was established by the founding members in May 2004. A memorandum of understanding was signed by the founding members in September 2004, and the UPA was officially announced in January 2005. It was a non-profit trade group registered in Belgium. Design of Systems on Silicon (DS2), a supplier of integrated circuits and software for PLC, was among the founding members; UPA systems were based on its technology. Other members included: AcBel, Ambient Corporation, bpl, Corinex Communications, IBEC, Netgear, PCN Technology, Toshiba, Toyo Network Systems, and Junaid.

The Universal Powerline Association released specifications related to three aspects of powerline technology. The UPA coexistence specification was published in June 2005. The UPA Access specification (the European OPERA project endorsed specification for Internet access over power lines) was published in February 2006. In-home systems and solutions, called "triple play" scenarios, were published in February 2006 as the UPA Digital Home Specification v1.0. The UPA worked with international standardisation bodies such as IEEE and ETSI. Certification events (known as Plugtests) were held in January 2006 and 2007, with products demonstrated at the Consumer Electronics Show.

DS2 had financial problems in 2010. Marvell Technology Group acquired the intellectual property of DS2 in August 2011, although it continued to provide UPA specifications compliant devices. With the exit of DS2 from the market, the UPA suspended activities in November 2010 and discontinued its website, although the UPA market continued through Marvell and its partners.
