= CEBus =

CEBus(r), short for Consumer Electronics Bus, also known as EIA-600, is a set of electrical standards and communication protocols for electronic devices to transmit commands and data. It is suitable for devices in households and offices to use, and might be useful for utility interface and light industrial applications.

== History ==
In 1984, members of the Electronic Industries Alliance (EIA) identified a need for standards that included more capability than the de facto home automation standard X10. X10 provided blind transmission of the commands ON, OFF, DIM, BRIGHT, ALL LIGHTS ON, and ALL UNITS OFF over powerline carrier, and later infrared and short range radio mediums. Over a six-year period, engineers representing international companies met on a regular basis and developed a proposed standard. They called this standard CEBus (pronounced "see bus"). The CEBus standard was released in September 1992.

CEBus is an open architecture set of specification documents which define protocols for products to communicate through power line wire, low voltage twisted pair wire, coaxial cable, infrared, RF, and fiber optics.

The CEBus Standard was developed on the foundation of an IR (infrared) protocol developed by GE (General Electric). This work was transferred to the EIA at the beginning of the EIA's involvement, under the plan that it would be expanded then maintained by the EIA.

== Technology ==
=== Powerline carrier ===
The CEBus standard includes such things as spread spectrum modulation on the power line. Spread spectrum involves starting a modulation at one frequency, and altering the frequency during its cycle. The CEBus power line standard begins each burst at 100 kHz, and increases linearly to 400 kHz during a 100 microsecond duration. Both the bursts (referred to as "superior" state) and the absence of burst (referred to as the "inferior" state) create similar digits, so a pause in between is not necessary.

A digit 1 is created by an inferior or superior state that lasts 100 microseconds, and a digit 0 is created by an inferior or superior state that lasts 200 microseconds. Consequently, the transmission rate is variable, depending upon how many of the characters are one and how many are zero; the average rate is about 7,500 bits per second. A 400 microsecond burst is an end of frame indicator and also saves time. For example, if the 32-bit destination address field has some of its most significant bits zero, they need not be sent; the end of frame delimits the field and all receiving devices assume the untransmitted bits are zero.

CEBus transmissions are strings or packets of data that also vary in length, depending upon how much data is included. Some packets can be hundreds of bits in length. The minimum packet size is 64 bits, which at an average rate of 7,500 bits per second, will take about 1/117th of a second to be transmitted and received.

=== Other media ===
Other media besides powerline carrier are specified: coaxial cable, infrared, radio frequency, and optical fiber. The initial offerings supported only a powerline carrier.

=== Addresses ===
The CEBus standard involves device addresses that are set in hardware at the factory, and include 4 billion possibilities. The standard also offers a defined language of many object oriented controls which include commands such as volume up, fast forward, rewind, pause, skip, and temperature up or down 1 degree.

=== Common Application Language ===
The CEBUS standard includes a large number of control and operation tables, called the CAL contexts. These tables identify a variety of control and monitoring commands that are used by remote devices (elsewhere in a home, or with the Internet, even elsewhere in the world) to communicate with CEBus certified products. The tables include commands for very simple actions, such as power on, power off, change channel, etc. Also included are the possibility for very sophisticated feature and functionality discovery and enumeration. For example, two products can communicate with each other, completely automatically, to discover what capabilities exist in Product A, such that Product B can then display that info, or simply use it to select services available, a sampling being: a list of channels/inputs/outputs available, special capabilities available (like Away Mode, Movie Mode, security parameters, etc.), or data tables within a residential electrical power meter.

This HPnP work expanded upon the EIA-600 foundation, which generally just provides the means by which residential products can physically get packets between each other. CAL contexts added language to further refine EIA-600 so that products can know what features others have to share.

The simplified CEBus standard stack includes HPnP, CAL contexts, CEBus standard, and EIA-600.

Some companies publicly acknowledged as working on HPnP in 1996 include Amp, Honeywell, Intel, IMS, Microsoft, Siemens Meter Division, Thomson Consumer Electronics (Technicolor).

Technologies developed in parallel with HPnP: 1394, IRDA, UPnP.

== Manufacturers ==
Presently, all of the communications hardware, language, and protocol is available on a chip produced by Intellon Corporation in Ocala, Florida and by Domosys Corporation in Quebec City, Quebec, Canada. Intellon or Domosys sell the chip to other manufacturers for use in their products, and offer to manufacture private label and OEM products using the CEBus standard. Intellon and Domosys also sell developer kits to develop a CEBus compatible product.

Having moved out of a laboratory and into the market, the CEBus trademark is owned by the EIA. Ongoing developments are conducted by a group known as the CIC (CEBus Industry Council). The CIC is a non-profit organization made up of the representatives of many national and international electronics firms, such as Microsoft, IBM, Compaq Computer Corp, AT&T Bell Labs, Honeywell, Panasonic, Sony, Thomson Consumer Electronics, Leviton, and Pacific Gas & Electric. Anyone can become a member of the CIC by paying an annual fee of $300 to $10,000 and fulfilling certain other requirements.

Although there is no restriction from anyone using the CEBus standard, the CIC is developing a non-profit testing laboratory which will be funded by certification charges. Manufacturers are encouraged to use the testing laboratory to verify the conformance of their product and its performance in a home network environment. When the performance is certified, the manufacturer pays a certification fee and is licensed to include the CEBus logo on their product.

== See also ==
- Electronic Industries Alliance
- C-Bus (protocol), a similar protocol with similar applications, but lacking a powerline carrier option, used mostly in Australia
- resources, book: https://www.amazon.com/CEBus-Demystified-ANSI-Users-Guide/dp/0071370064
- resources, book: https://pdfslide.net/documents/cebus-demystified-the-ansi-eia-600-users-guide.html
- publication: https://books.google.com/books?id=41XoBQAAQBAJ&dq=cebus+network+information&pg=PA119
