= Insteon =

Home automation system

- Developed by: Smartlabs, Inc.
- Introduced: 2005
- Industry: Home automation
- Connector type: Wi-Fi, Powerline
- Compatible hardware: LED bulbs; wall switches and keypads; sensors
- Website: www.insteon.com

Insteon is a proprietary home automation (domotics) system that enables light switches, lights, leak sensors, remote controls, motion sensors, and other electrically powered devices to interoperate through power lines, radio frequency (RF) communications, or both. It employs a dual-mesh networking topology in which all devices are peers and each device independently transmits, receives, confirm and repeats messages. Like other home automation systems, it had been associated with the Internet of things.

== Protocol ==
Every message received by an Insteon compatible device undergoes error detection and correction and is then retransmitted to improve reliability. All devices retransmit the same message simultaneously so that message transmissions are synchronous to the powerline frequency, thus preserving the integrity of the message while strengthening the signal on the powerline and reducing RF dead zones. Insteon powerline messaging uses phase-shift keying. Insteon RF messaging uses frequency-shift keying.

== Network topology ==
Insteon is an integrated dual-mesh (formerly referred to as "dual-band") network that combines wireless radio frequency (RF) and a building's existing electrical wiring, in which all devices are peers and each device independently transmits, receives, and repeats messages.

The electrical wiring becomes a backup transmission medium in the event of RF/wireless interference. Conversely, RF/wireless becomes a backup transmission medium in the event of powerline interference. As a peer-to-peer network, devices do not require network supervision, thus allowing optional operation without central controllers and routing tables.

Insteon devices can function without a central controller. Additionally, they may be managed by a central controller to implement functions such as control via smartphones and tablets, control scheduling, event handling, and problem reporting via email or text messaging.

== Products ==
Insteon initially produced over 200 products using its technology, including LED bulbs, wall switches, wall keypads, sensors, plug in modules and embedded devices, along with central controllers for system management. In June 2019, it was reported that Insteon was reducing the number of products it sold to focus on less commoditized connected products like smart lighting and electrical controls.

Insteon marketed two different central controllers: its own brand, called the Insteon Hub, and a newer HomeKit-enabled Insteon Hub Pro designed for Apple HomeKit compatibility. In 2012, the company introduced the first network-controlled LED light bulb.

The Hub Pro was later discontinued, according to a note on Insteon's web site.

== Compatibility ==
Older Insteon chip sets manufactured by Smartlabs can transmit, receive, and respond to (but not repeat) X10 power line messages, thus enabling X10 networks to interoperate with Insteon.

In 2014, Insteon released apps for Windows 8 and Windows Phone, as part of an agreement with Microsoft to sell its kits at Microsoft Store locations. The Windows Phone also featured voice control via Cortana.

In 2015, voice control was added via compatibility with Amazon Echo. That same year, Logitech announced that the remote for the Harmony Hub (a smart home hub) would support Insteon devices when deployed with an Insteon Hub. Also in 2015, Insteon announced an initiative to integrate the Google-owned Nest learning thermostat with the Insteon Hub.

Insteon was one of two launch partners for Apple's HomeKit platform, with the HomeKit-enabled Insteon Hub Pro. In 2015, Insteon announced support for the Apple Watch, allowing watch owners to control their home with an Insteon Hub.

== Corporate history ==
Insteon
- Type: Private
- Founded: Irvine, California (2005)
- Headquarters: Irvine, California; United States
- Key people: Joe Dada, Founder
- Products: Proprietary dual-band home automation and lighting control systems using radio frequency (RF) and powerline technology
- Parent: Smartlabs, Inc.
- Website: www.insteon.com

Insteon-based products were launched in 2005 by Smartlabs, the company which holds the trademark for Insteon. A Smartlabs subsidiary, also named Insteon, was created to market the technology. CEO Joe Dada had previously founded Smarthome in 1992, a home automation product catalog company, and operator of the Smarthome.com e-commerce site. In the late 1990s, Dada acquired two product engineering firms which undertook extensive product development efforts to create networking technology based on both power-line and RF communications. In 2004, the company filed for patent protection for the resultant technology, called Insteon, and it was released in 2005.

In 2012, the company released the first network-controlled light bulb using Insteon-enabled technology, and at that point Dada spun Insteon off from Smarthome.

In 2017, SmartLabs and the Insteon trademark were acquired by Richmond Capital Partners.

The company produced over 200 products featuring the technology.

In a community statement published on the Insteon.com website, Smartlabs has revealed that it had been looking for a parent company to purchase and continue developing the Insteon ecosystem following supply-chain issues during the COVID-19 pandemic. This sale failed to materialize in March 2022 and subsequently a financial services firm had been tasked with optimizing the assets of the company.

In mid-April 2022, the company appeared to have abruptly shut down. In June 2022, a group of Insteon users acquired the company and its assets to rebuild the business. In October 2022, Insteon services were brought back by the new owners.
