= List of broadband over power line deployments =

This is a list of broadband over power line deployments. In this sense, "broadband" usually refers to Internet access using power line communication technology.

== BPL pilot projects - 1st Gen (UPA) ==
=== Inactive pilot projects ===
1. North America:
  - United States: The United Telecom Council publishes the Federal Communications Commission (FCC)-mandated BPL Interference Resolution website, which provides a list of all BPL deployments in the US.
  - Canada: Quebec: As of 2005, PLC communication technology developed by Ariane Controls is being installed inside and outside existing buildings to control lights and other energy-hungry devices. The cheap devices allow energy consumption to be better managed, and so save much energy and bring a clear return on investment.
2. Western Europe:
  - Sweden: Vattenfall is using PLC technology at 1200 baud for automatic meter reading based on an Iskraemeco product.
3. Central and Eastern Europe, and Eurasia:
  - Russian Federation: Electro-com has deployed widely BPL/PLC technology and offers internet access service in Moscow, Nizhny Novgorod, Ryazan, Kaluga and Rostov-on-Don, planning to extend coverage to main Russian cities. Currently the company does not provide other services, though plans to start providing telephone, and television services someday. Base equipment is a DefiDev modem with a DS2 chipset. The company had 35,000 subscribers and an annual growth of 15-20%. The company has, however, halted operations in Moscow in September 2008, having sold its client network to an IDSL internet provider.
  - Romania: In January 2006, the Ministry of Communications and Information Technology introduced a PLC trial in the rural locality of Band, Mureș County, offering phone and broadband internet access for €7 per month. The technology was introduced to 50 households.
  - Montenegro: In March 2002, the Internet Crna Gora biggest internet provider in Montenegro launched a pilot project in town of Cetinje.
  - Serbia: In August 2002, the Star Engineering from Niš launched a pilot project to show a completely new way to access the Internet, which is a new in that time in most countries around the world.
  - Hungary: The first powerline service in Hungary was realized in September 2003, in the Riverside apartment house in Budapest by 23Vnet Ltd. The PLC equipment was supplied by ASCOM Powerline. After four months the service was counting 100 users from 450 apartment owners. The bandwidth is 4.5 Mbit/s.
4. Asia, Pacific, and Oceania:
  - Indonesia:
    - PT Kejora Gemilang Internusa "KEJORA", under their banner PLANET BROADBAND, is currently rolling out broadband over power line, with over 300,000 homes expected to be enabled by August 2010. PT. Kejora Gemilang Internusa signed an 8-year Joint Venture concession agreement with ICON+ a division of PT. Perusahaan Listrik Negara (Indonesia electricity company). Under the terms of the agreement PLAnet Broadband are to supply BPL/PLC to Jakarta West and West Java.
    - Another company, PT. Broadband Powerline Indonesia, has been developing broadband over power line in apartment buildings since 2006. PT. BPI also produces data couplers to make broadband over powerline possible in three phases (R, S, T) with a single master.
  - India : In India IIIT Allahabad has completed a project in co-operation with Corinex Communications Canada to implement a prototype of BPL for University campus and nearby villages.
5. Africa and the Middle East:
  - Egypt: The Engineering Office for Integrated Projects (EOIP) has deployed PLC technology widely in Alexandria, Fayed, and Tanta. Based on a locally developed system, the company provides AMR for electricity utilities. Currently, the company has about 70,000 subscribers.
  - South Africa: Goal Technology Solutions (GTS) trialled the technology and is offering service in the suburbs of Pretoria, and plans to extend it to other areas. The tests were done with Mitsubishi equipment using a DS2 chipset, and the company claims a maximum throughput of 90 Mbit/s although initially only "512 Kbits/s ADSL equivalent speeds" are available. Now it uses DefiDev's equipment, and according to GTS's website, it will expand available bandwidth up to 5-20 Mbit/s.
  - Ghana:
    - Cactel Communications, Ltd. successfully deployed an MV solution pilot project in the Graphic Communications Group in Accra in June 2005.
    - A Cactel Remote Energy Management System (REMS) pilot project for the Electricity Company of Ghana (ECG) is running a 40-user pilot project at the University of Ghana in Legon. The current project combines fiber, radio link, Wi-Fi and PLC to provide broadband internet access and telephony. It showcases the interoperability of PLC technology and the company's expertise in emerging market design and deployment. Cactel hopes to deploy nationally, and is in deliberations with the national stakeholders and with Ghana's Ministry of Communications (MoC).
    - AllTerra Communications successfully implemented a pilot test of broadband over power lines in Akosombo. In partnership with VRA, this test involves demonstrating transmission of broadband from medium to low voltage signals. AllTerra is working with VRA to expand the pilot project to include essential grid management utilities that will help balance and manage the current electricity transmission throughout their various substations. Using IT as a catalyst for economic development, AllTerra is expanding into numerous areas throughout Ghana.
    - Vobiss Solutions Ltd successfully implemented a Hybrid Fibre BPL pilot network within EMEFS Hillview Estate in collaboration with ECG.
  - Saudi Arabia:
    - ElectroNet has been working with the Saudi Electric Company since 2005 on a pilot project using broadband over power lines over medium voltage cables and linking into low voltage distribution within a shopping mall. The pilot project also integrates automatic meter readers.
    - Powerlines Communications Co. Ltd. implemented an AMR pilot project for Saudi Electricity Company in 2006. The project was located in the city of Jeddah on the west coast of Saudi Arabia. Digital KWh meters were installed in parallel with analog KWh meters. Readings taken by the Saudi Electricity Company showed variations of less than 1%. A BPL pilot project was included.
    - Saudi Arabian Computer Management Consultants (SACMAC) has signed a deal to become an official system integrator and distributor for Mitsubishi PLC. It is expected to become a great success, because the existing broadband service, monopolized by the Saudi Telecom Company, is expensive and has poor customer service (some clients report that company techs arrive months after ordering). SACMAC has declined to talk about specifics of availability and price but says it will start rolling out the service in a few months (as of May 2006) and its price will be lower than current broadband providers.

=== Concluded pilot projects ===
The following pilot projects have ended:

1. Australia, Tasmania: In November 2007, electricity retailer Aurora Energy ended its involvement with BPL and announced it was switching to Optical Fiber. This ended their commercial trial begun in September 2005, offering BPL services to 500 homes in the suburb of Tolmans Hill near Hobart, which had followed a successful technological trial earlier that year.
2. Portugal ended BPL/PLC deployments in the country in October 2006, reportedly for economic reasons.,
3. Russian Federation: In September 2008, Russia's only BPL provider Electro-com ended deployments in Moscow for economic reasons.
4. Spain: In May 2007 Iberdrola and Endesa (the main power companies in Spain) ended their projects to deploy PLC.
5. United States: As of July 2010, the City of Manassas, VA has shut down their BPL deployment, which was the largest in the country.

As of April 2007, Motorola has shuttered its Powerline LV Access BPL and reportedly plans to re-purpose the technology to a new system called Powerline MU, which is for use within multiple-unit dwellings. Motorola's system uses only residential-side low-voltage power lines for transmission to reduce the antenna effect, and successfully demonstrated frequency-notching for reduced potential for interference over the Amperion Inc. and Current Technologies LLC systems. Motorola invited the American Radio Relay League to participate with these tests, and even installed the Motorola system at their headquarters. Preliminary results were very positive with regard to interference, because the Motorola system does not use BPL on the powerlines leading up to the neighborhood. The BPL carrier is only used for the last leg of the trip from the pole to the house, and gets the signal to the pole via radio. This limits the interference to the area surrounding the last leg to the house.

=== Dismantled pilot projects ===
The following other BPL trials in the US are dismantled as of May 2008:

Location	Electric provider	Equipment
AL, Hoover (and other cities)	Southern Company	Various
AZ, Cottonwood	Arizona Power Systems (APS)	Mitsubishi
CA, Menlo Park	Pacific Gas and Electric Company (PG&E)	Main.net
CA, Rosemead	Southern California Edison (SCE)	Current Technologies
CA, San Diego	San Diego Gas and Electric (SDG&E)	Various
CT, Shelton	United Illuminating	Amperion
FL, Graceville	West Florida Electric Cooperative	Ascom
FL, Miami	Florida Power and Light	Amperion and Main.net
GA, Douglasville	Greystone Power	Mitsubishi
GA, Young Harris	The Sphigler Group	Main.net
HI, Honolulu	Honolulu Electric Company	Current Technologies
IA, Cedar Rapids	Alliant Energy	Amperion
ID, Boise	IDACorp	Various
IN, Liberty	Whitewater RMEMC	Corinex
MD, Hughesville	Southern Maryland Electric Company	Current Technologies
MD, Potomac	PEPCO	Current Technologies
MN, Rochester	Rochester Public Utilities	Main.net
MO, Lees Summit	Aquila	Amperion
NC, Raleigh	Progress Energy	Amperion
OH, Cincinnati	Duke Energy	Current Technologies
NY, Penn Yan	Penn Yan Power and Light	Amperion
PA, Allentown	Pennsylvania Power and Light	Main.net and Amperion
TN, Fayetteville	Fayetteville Public Utilities	Grid Stream
TX, Dallas	Oncor Electric Delivery Company	Current
TX, Austin	Austin Electric Energy	Corinex
TX, Flatonia	Broadband Horizons	Unknown
TX, Weimar	Fayette Electric Cooperative	PowerWan
VA, Roanoke	American Electric Power	Mitsubishi
WA, Wenatchee	Heights, Chelan County PUD	Gridstream
