= UBP =

UBP or Ubp may refer to:

- Ubon Ratchathani Airport, an airport near the city of Ubon Ratchathani, Thailand
- Ulusal Birlik Partisi, the National Unity Party of Northern Cyprus
- Unbipentium, symbol Ubp for 125, a theoretical chemical element
- Union Bancaire Privée, a private bank in Switzerland specializing in asset management
- UnionBank (Philippines), a universal banking group
- United Bermuda Party, a political party
- Unnatural base pair, a DNA subunit that does not occur in nature
- Urstadt Biddle Properties, an American real estate company

== See also ==
- UPB (disambiguation)
