= Peripheral Sensor Interface 5 =

Digital interface for sensors

Peripheral Sensor Interface (PSI5) is a digital interface for sensors.

PSI5 is a two-wire interface, used to connect peripheral sensors to electronic control units in automotive electronics. Both point-to-point and bus configurations with asynchronous and synchronous data transmission are supported.

== Functional description ==
PSI5 is a current interface with modulation of the sending current for the transmission of data on the power supply lines. The relatively high sending current and the use of a Manchester code for bit encoding result in high immunity against interference from radiated emissions. The use of an inexpensive twisted pair cable is thus sufficient for most applications, however, in automotive more expensive cabling is employed.

Data words consist of two start bits, 8 to 24 data bits and a single parity bit or optional three bit CRC (cyclic redundancy check). The bitrate is 125 kbit/s or optionally 189 kbit/s.

== Standardization ==
Following the goal of an open interface standard, PSI5 was developed on the basis of existing proprietary implementations of companies Autoliv, Bosch and Continental. A first common publication was released at the "Sensor" trade fair in Nuremberg in May 2005. Since summer 2006, Siemens VDO also supports the standardization of PSI5. Siemens VDO is now a part of the Continental group.

IEC EMC standard for Peripheral Sensor Interface 5 (PSI5) IEC62228-6 "Integrated circuit - EMC Evaluation of transceivers - Part 6:PSI5 transceivers" is ongoing.

== See also ==
- List of network buses
