= Blind transmission =

Telecommunications transmission without receipt

A blind transmission, in telecommunications, is a transmission made without obtaining a receipt, or acknowledgment of reception, from the intended receiving station. Blind transmissions may occur or be necessary when security constraints, such as radio silence, are imposed, when technical difficulties with a sender's receiver or receiver's transmitter occur, or when lack of time precludes the delay caused by waiting for receipts.

== Examples ==
- In aviation it is common to "transmit in the blind" when an aircraft is approaching a non-towered airport. The pilot will broadcast his position and intentions over a common frequency. If no other aircraft are in the traffic pattern, the pilot continues to transmit his position in the blind in case another aircraft is in the area but unable to respond.
- If air traffic control is attempting to establish communication with a presumed NORDO aircraft, or aircraft on the incorrect frequency, it would be appropriate phraseology to issue a transmission that includes the blind preamble, e.g., "New York Center in the blind, N1234, if you copy this transmission, squawk ident."
- The less common reason would be a ground control station not being able to transmit (due to transmitter failure) or not wanting to transmit any acknowledgment (to avoid giving away further information and putting a military mission at risk).

== See also ==
- Transmission time
