= Smart grid in the United States =

Support for the smart grid in the United States became federal policy with passage of the Energy Independence and Security Act of 2007. The law set out $100 million in funding per fiscal year from 2008 to 2012, established a matching program to states, utilities and consumers to build smart grid capabilities, and created a Grid Modernization Commission to assess the benefits of demand response and to recommend needed protocol standards. The law also directed the National Institute of Standards and Technology to develop smart grid standards, which the Federal Energy Regulatory Commission (FERC) would then promulgate through official rulemakings.

Smart grids received further support with the passage of the American Recovery and Reinvestment Act of 2009, which set aside $4.5 billion of funding for Smart Grid development, deployment, and worker training.

== Policy related to smart grids ==
In May 2009, Commerce Secretary Gary Locke announced that he will co-chair a smart grid meeting with Secretary of Energy Steven Chu in Washington, D.C. The meeting was to bring together industry and government leaders to begin a critical discussion about developing industry-wide standards for smart grid technologies. Industry leaders at this meeting were expected to pledge to harmonize industry standards and to commit to a timetable to reach a standards agreement.

President Barack Obama announced the largest single electric grid modernization investment in U.S. history on Oct. 27, 2009, with DOE tapping $3.4 billion in American Reinvestment and Recovery Act funds for 100 projects. The funds will be matched by $4.7 billion in private investments. According to the president, the smart grid projects will help build a renewable energy superhighway, with a goal of increasing energy efficiency and helping to spur the growth of renewable energy resources such as wind and solar power. The grants range from $400,000 to $200 million and will reach every state except Alaska.

Much of the funding will support upgrades to the utility power grids, including the installation of more than 200,000 smart transformers, which will make it possible for power companies to replace units before they fail. Utilities will also install more than 850 sensors that will cover all of the electric grid in the contiguous United States, making it possible for grid operators to better monitor grid conditions and allowing them to take advantage of intermittent renewable energy, such as wind and solar power. Utilities will install nearly 700 automated substations, which will make it possible for power companies to respond faster and more effectively to restore service when bad weather knocks down power lines or causes electricity disruptions.
