= Serial Input/Output eXchange =

SIOX is an asynchronous serial communication bus that uses 300 – 19 200 bit/s (default 4800) datarates. Specified by Telefrang AB in Sweden, it is widely used in factories, plants, ships and district heating systems.

The bus can use point-to-point, bus, tree, star and ring topologies and uses a 24 V level, with a short-circuit current of 20 – 50 mA. It is also recommended that twisted pair is used as well as a cable area of 1.5 mm². 6-bit addresses are used, giving 62 valid addresses.

== See also ==
- List of network buses
