= SiConnect =

Graphic of SiConnect Ltd's corporate logo

SiConnect was a powerline communications technology business that built broadband modem silicon using a proprietary technology. It was founded in England in 2004, and was dissolved in 2010. SiConnect is most notable now for contributing its Arbitration-Determined Multiplexing technology to the IEEE P1901 draft specification for co-existence between disparate powerline technologies.

== Company history ==
SiConnect was founded in 2004 by Trevor Sokell, a communications technology veteran. SiConnect was a reboot of nSine, a powerline communications technology developer founded in 1999 but which failed to secure refinancing in 2002 during the economic recession at the time. SiConnect took nSine's core technology, productised it as the PLT050 integrated circuit, branded the technology as "POEM" (a contraction of "Powerline Empowered"), and standardized it within IEEE's P1901 working group. SiConnect operated a standard fabless semiconductor business model. It was registered in England and Wales with registration number 05029159.

The company was privately held and funded by three technology-focussed early-stage venture capital funds. Following a change of strategy by the lead investor, the business was put up for sale in early 2008 just as first revenues from the PLT050 began to flow. The PLT050 delivered the same application-level performance as Intellon's HomePlug Turbo silicon but at the cheaper price point of HomePlug 1.0 silicon. Its major market was in China, where the domestic market could not afford the pricing of the more complex HomePlug designs. SiConnect's sales and marketing management team created a joint venture with its largest Chinese customer - Vigoole - which then purchased the SiConnect business. The company's operations were moved to Shenzhen and renamed as Poem Technology. During the sales process, SiConnect's sales and marketing leadership attempted an MBO based around the company's first sales pipeline (the investors not having already put one together for the sales process) and a restructured business plan for the next generation of powerline product. The existing investors were unable to provide the capital required for the buyout, and the sale to Vigoole completed later in 2008.

As the UK's first broadband powerline communications technology startup, SiConnect received substantial press coverage in leading ICT-sector trade journals, including EE Times, Electronics Weekly and EDN.

== Products ==
SiConnect's technology combined simple building blocks within a holistic system design, with the aim being to avoid the complexity of heavily engineered approaches such as HomePlug's so as to achieve similar performance at a much lower price. The first generation of its POEM technology had a 21 Mbit/s PHY layer, from which it could easily deliver 14 Mbit/s of application-level performance - very similar to its contemporary "HomePlug Turbo" technology, despite its much higher PHY rate of 85 Mbit/s. Whereas HomePlug-style approaches relied heavily on FEC and other coding techniques to ensure end-to-end throughput over a heavyweight OFDM modulation layer, POEM used lightweight agile carriers that were able to re-tune to dodge any major sources of dynamic noise on any given link, thereby relieving the need for strong FEC. Corner case performance would not have been as strong, but the typical scenarios were served as well as with HomePlug, but with much lower implementation cost.

SiConnect's first product was the PLT050, which was launched in 2007. This was the digital baseband integrated circuit for its 21 Mbit/s POEM powerline comms technology. It presented Ethernet and USB data-plane traffic interfaces, as well as a host-processor interface port for control-plane management. The PLT050 was built on UMC's 0.18 micron digital process. The PLT050 required an external analog front-end (AFE) circuit, including an integrated component for high-speed and scalable analog-to-digital and digital-to-analog conversion. Initial powerline modems built around the PLT050 used Analog Devices's AD9865 integrated AFE part, in common with the powerline modem designs from other silicon manufacturers. SiConnect had designed its own integrated AFE, codenamed the SCA10, which delivered superior performance at lower cost than the AD9865. The company intended to combine the SCA10 with the PLT050 in a single package to sell a single-package solution to be known as the PLi050, but this had not come to market before SiConnect ceased trading.

== Applications ==
The PLT050/PLi050 were aimed primarily at the audio distribution market. POEM's key strengths were its low cost (the silicon was inherently simpler in design than HomePlug-style solutions, hence cheaper to produce) and its support for multiple qualities of service. Its ability to support loss-less uncompressed streaming audio with low jitter, without interruption in the presence of bursty data traffic, was a key attraction to hardware OEMs looking for solutions for the home theater market. This application was successfully showcased at CES 2008, receiving strong interest from major OEMs.

=== Arbitration-Determined Multiplexing ===
SiConnect's cost advantage over HomePlug offerings was derived from the use of a non-OFDM PHY (physical layer) and SMA/CR as the basis of its MAC layer. SMA/CR stands for Synchronous Multiple Access and Contention Resolution, whereby multiple nodes that wish to transmit data onto the medium simultaneously may begin to do so, with a contention resolution mechanism built into the MAC that clearly identifies who wins the contention and who does not, without data loss arising from interference when more than one node transmits at once. SiConnect's innovation was to incorporate quality of service support into the contention resolution mechanism, ensuring that priority was given to network traffic requiring the highest quality of service, and also a backoff feature that ensured the loser of a contention would be more likely to win any future contention. Together, this support for real-time content delivery provided for much more efficient usage of the resources of the PHY layer. This meant that SiConnect's low-cost 21 Mbit/s PHY could compete in performance with HomePlug Turbo's more costly 85 Mbit/s PHY.

== Intellectual property ==
Besides trademarks over the SiConnect and POEM brands, SiConnect filed eight patents. The first of these was granted during SiConnect's lifetime. The granted patent, and the seven outstanding applications, were assigned to Poem Technology after its acquisition of SiConnect. However, Poem Technology let all the applications, and the granted patent, lapse. SiConnect's intellectual property portfolio was well-regarded within the tight-knit community of powerline communications technology developers and patent agents. The patents concerned were:

- "Data transmission method and apparatus" - Granted as US7103688(B2)
- "Data transmission method and apparatus" - Application WO2007144605(A1)
- "Method and device for powerline communication" - Application WO2007144600(A1)
- "Communications apparatus" - Application WO2007144594(A1)
- "DQPSK timing estimation using quaternary to polar conversion" - Application GB2439125(A)
- "Digital gain control" - Application WO2008029114(A1)
- "Data communications" - Application WO2008047069(A1)
- "Transformer and common mode choke component" - Application GB2447483(A)

== Standardisation activities ==
SiConnect was active in several international technical standards bodies, including IEEE, HGI and ETSI. It was also involved in leading the CEPCA industry trade association, where it resourced the marketing working group activity.

SiConnect's Arbitration-Determined Multiplexing SMA/CR technology was presented to IEEE's P1901 working group at its meeting in Edinburgh in July 2007, and subsequently incorporated into the P1901 co-existence cluster specification.

SiConnect presentation to IEEE P1901 working group at July 2007 meeting in Edinburgh (regarding CX cluster technical submission 0321 r0)
