= Universal powerline bus =

Universal Powerline Bus (UPB) is a proprietary software protocol developed by Powerline Control Systems for power-line communication between devices used for home automation. Household electrical wiring is used to send digital data between UPB devices via pulse-position modulation.

Communication is peer to peer, with no central controller necessary.

UPB addressing allows 250 devices per house and 250 houses per transformer, allowing over 62,500 total device addresses and can co-exist with other powerline carrier systems within the same home.

As of 2018, UPB enjoys one of the broadest ranges of device types when compared to most protocols and has support from some major manufacturers in the home automation space, most notably, Leviton and their Omni series of home automation products, as well as the UPB devices they market. UPB is also supported by many major home automation software manufacturers. A few of which are listed below.

== Reliability ==
UPB is a highly reliable protocol for home automation. It is not susceptible to RF interference, signal blockage by walls or short distance broadcast issues like some wireless protocols. UPB transmits on the building's existing wiring and has extensive noise reduction circuitry. This allows it to traverse long distances without issues, even across multiple electrical panels, making it ideal for very large homes. Appliances that have traditionally plagued X10 devices, usually do not affect UPB. In fact, UPB signals can reliably be received by the target device even with significant amounts of electrical noise on the power lines. However, in the event that an appliance in home causes extreme interference when operating, an inexpensive wire-in noise filter can be applied at the circuit breaker panel to solve the issue.

== Interoperability ==
As of 2025, control of UPB devices is supported by the Hubitat via open source UPBeat drivers by Xeren.io.

As of 2020, control of UPB devices is supported by the Home Assistant (Home Assistant) open source software (in version 0.110 and later).

As of 2017, control of UPB devices is supported by the OpenHAB open source software.

HomeSeer is a well known commercial home automation software package that has support for UPB.

Mobile App support (IOS and Android) is available by using the PulseWorx Gateway (PGW) plug-in module.

Voice recognition products such as Alexa, Automated Living's HAL and Google's Assistant are supported either directly or indirectly through a device or automation controller.

UPB can coexist with other powerline technologies. It can also interoperate with other automation devices that use RF (for example) through the use of a multi protocol automation controller (See Leviton Omni, HomeSeer devices). This allows for a mixed technology automation system to achieve best in class devices from many manufacturers. However, unlike most wireless protocols, UPB does not require an automation controller or hub to operate.

Since UPB is a peer-to-peer protocol, individual switches, scene controllers and various types of plug-in modules can be individually programmed to do multiple tasks without the need to purchase a hub or controller. Some examples of actions that can be achieved without a hub or controller would be

- timed shutoff of a bathroom fan (timer plug-in module or a switch with timer feature built-in)
- turn lights on or off based on a photocell's sensing of sunlight (I/O plug-in module)
- turn on one set of lights with a single tap of a switch and turning on another set of lights or devices on a double tap of the switch (dimmer switch)
- turn on/off a hot tub (load controller switch)
- multiple preset light dimming settings (scene controller switch)
- turn on/off a motorized device (relay switch).

Scene controllers with built-in Infrared (IR) sensors are available. This allows for a single programmable remote control (universal remote) like those made by Logitech to control both lighting and television or other media devices.

== Hardware manufacturers ==
The following is a list of UPB device manufacturers. This is not a comprehensive list:

- Leviton HLC line now sold by PCS
- Powerline Control Systems PulseWorx line
- Web Mountain equivalent products now sold by PCS
