= Power-line communication =

Data network that uses electrical wiring

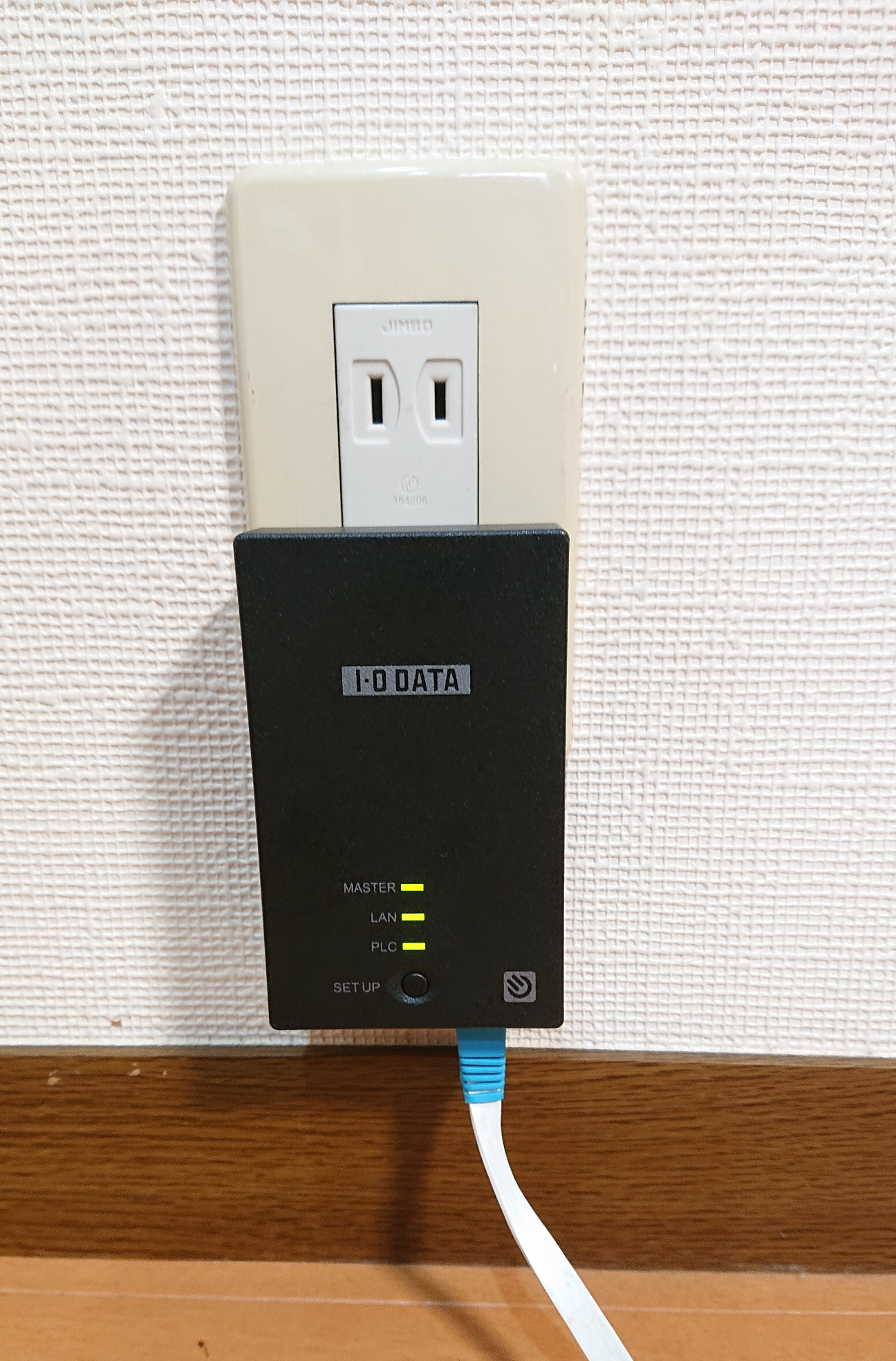
Power line adapter

Power-line communication (PLC) is the carrying of data on a conductor (the power-line carrier) that is also used simultaneously for AC electric power transmission or electric power distribution to consumers.

A wide range of power-line communication technologies is needed for different applications, ranging from home automation to Internet access, which is often called broadband over power lines (BPL). Most PLC technologies limit themselves to one type of wiring (such as premises wiring within a single building), but some can cross between two levels (for example, both the distribution network and premises wiring). Typically, transformers prevent the propagation of the signal, which requires multiple technologies to form very large networks. Various data rates and frequencies are used in different situations.

A number of difficult technical problems are common between Wireless and power-line communication, notably those of spread spectrum radio signals operating in a crowded environment. Radio interference, for example, has long been a concern of amateur radio groups.

== History ==
Appearing as early as 1925, carrier equipment for power lines was designed for use by electric utility companies to facilitate communication with technicians operating high-voltage electrical equipment, which was often located hundreds of miles away from existing telephone infrastructure. Instead of running new dedicated telephone wires to remote locations, carrier equipment could be used to transmit telephone signals over high-voltage power lines rated up to 220,000 volts. High-voltage carrier equipment was installed by electricians, and low-voltage carrier equipment was installed by phone technicians.

The M carrier system was one of a series of early carrier systems developed by AT&T for long-distance communications. M1 carrier equipment was designed for use with rural 7,200 volt power lines and could be installed without disrupting power to the grid. By 1953, the Bell System had almost 10,000 M1 carrier stations in service.

== Basics ==
Power-line communications systems operate by adding a modulated carrier signal to the wiring system. Different types of power-line communications use different frequency bands. Since the power distribution system was originally intended for transmission of AC power at typical frequencies of 50 or 60 Hz, power wire circuits have only a limited ability to carry higher frequencies. The propagation problem is a limiting factor for each type of power-line communications.

The main issue determining the frequencies of power-line communication is laws that limit interference with radio services. Wiring for power transmission typically uses unshielded cable. The unshielded cable may cause radio interference when the cable is used for high-frequency data signals; see Electromagnetic shielding for details.

Many nations regulate unshielded wired emissions as if they were radio transmitters. These jurisdictions usually require unlicensed uses to be below 500 kHz or in unlicensed radio bands. Some jurisdictions (such as the EU) regulate wire-line transmissions further. The U.S. is a notable exception, permitting limited-power wide-band signals to be injected into unshielded wiring, as long as the wiring is not designed to propagate radio waves in free space.

Data rates and distance limits vary widely over many power-line communication standards. Low-frequency (about 100–200 kHz) carriers impressed on high-voltage transmission lines may carry one or two analog voice circuits, or telemetry and control circuits with an equivalent data rate of a few hundred bits per second; however, these circuits may be many miles long. Higher data rates generally imply shorter ranges; a local area network operating at millions of bits per second may only cover one floor of an office building, but eliminates the need for installation of dedicated network cabling.

== Types ==
Although different protocols and legislation exist throughout the world, there are basically only two types of PLC: the indoor PLC and the outdoor PLC.

- Indoor PLC: indoor PLC is used for LAN networking and narrowband in-house applications, such as home automation. It uses house power wiring to transmit data, injecting the current directly into the power plugs.
- Outdoor PLC: applied in the main power line transmissions, such as low-frequency PLC (for telemetry and grid control), and in BPL, for internet transmission via the power network. In this type of PLC, the equipment must be robust to deal with the high voltage levels of the power lines.

== Ripple control ==
Ripple control adds an audio-frequency tone to an AC line. Typical frequencies are from 100 to 2400 Hz. Each district usually has its own frequency, so that adjacent areas are unaffected. Codes are sent by slowly turning the tone on and off. Equipment at a customer site receives the codes and turns customer equipment off and on. Often, the decoder is part of a standard electricity meter and controls relays. There are also utility codes, e.g., to set the clocks of the power meters at midnight.

In this way, the utility can avoid up to 20% of capital expenses for generating equipment. This lowers costs for electricity and fuel usage. Brownouts and rolling blackouts are more easily prevented. Grids that use cogeneration can enable auxiliary customer equipment when the generators are being run to generate heat rather than electricity.

An annoyance for customers is that sometimes the code to turn equipment on is lost, or load shedding is inconvenient or dangerous. For example, during a party, a dangerous heat wave or when life-preserving medical equipment is on-site. To handle these cases, some equipment includes switches to circumvent load shedding. Some meters switch into a higher billing rate when the switch is flipped.

== Long haul, low frequency ==
Utility companies use special coupling capacitors to connect radio transmitters and receivers to the AC power-carrying conductors. Power meters often use small transformers with linear amplifiers in the range of tens of watts. Most of the expense of any PLC system is the power electronics. By comparison, the electronics to encode and decode is usually small, in a special-purpose integrated circuit. Thus, even the complicated OFDM standards can still be economical.

Frequencies used are in the range of 24 to 500 kHz, with transmitter power levels up to hundreds of watts. These signals may be impressed on one conductor, on two conductors or on all three conductors of a high-voltage AC transmission line. Several PLC channels may be coupled onto one high-voltage line. Filtering devices are applied at substations to prevent the carrier frequency current from being bypassed through the station apparatus and to ensure that distant faults do not affect the isolated segments of the PLC system. These circuits are used for control of switchgear and for protection of transmission lines. For example, a protective relay can use a PLC channel to trip a line if a fault is detected between its two terminals, but to leave the line in operation if the fault is elsewhere on the system.

While utility companies use microwave and now, increasingly, fiber-optic cables for their primary system communication needs, the power-line carrier apparatus may still be useful as a backup channel or for very simple low-cost installations that do not warrant installing fiber optic lines, or which are inaccessible to radio or other communication.

=== Design ===
To sectionalize the transmission network and protect against failures, a wave trap is connected in series with the power (transmission) line. They consist of one or more sections of resonant circuits, which block the high-frequency carrier waves (24–500 kHz) and let power frequency current (50–60 Hz) pass through. Wave traps are used in the switchyards of most power stations to prevent carriers from entering the station equipment. Each wave trap has a lightning arrester to protect it from surge voltages.

A coupling capacitor is used to connect the transmitters and receivers to the high-voltage line. This provides a low-impedance path for carrier energy to the high-voltage line but blocks the power frequency circuit by being a high-impedance path. The coupling capacitor may be part of a capacitor voltage transformer used for voltage measurement.

Power-line carrier systems have long been a favorite at many utilities because they allow them to reliably move data over an infrastructure that they control.

A PLC carrier repeating station is a facility at which a PLC signal on a power line is refreshed. Therefore, the signal is filtered out from the power line, demodulated and modulated on a new carrier frequency, and then injected into the power line again. As PLC signals can span long distances (several hundred kilometers), such facilities only exist on very long power lines using PLC equipment.

=== Power-line carrier communication ===
Power-line carrier communication (PLCC) is mainly used for telecommunication, tele-protection and tele-monitoring between electrical substations through power lines at high voltages, such as 110 kV, 220 kV, 400 kV.

The modulation generally used in these systems is amplitude modulation. The carrier frequency range is used for audio signals, protection and a pilot frequency. The pilot frequency is a signal in the audio range that is transmitted continuously for failure detection.

The voice signal is compressed and filtered into the 300 to 4000 Hz range, and this audio frequency is mixed with the carrier frequency. The carrier frequency is again filtered, amplified and transmitted. The transmission power of these HF carrier frequencies will be in the range of 0 to +32 dbW. This range is set according to the distance between substations.

PLCC can be used for interconnecting private branch exchanges (PBXs).

=== Automatic meter reading ===
PLC is one of the technologies used for automatic meter reading. Both one-way and two-way systems have been successfully used for decades. Interest in this application has grown substantially in recent history, not so much because there is an interest in automating a manual process, but because there is an interest in obtaining fresh data from all metered points in order to better control and operate the system. PLC is one of the technologies being used in Advanced Metering Infrastructure (AMI) systems.

In a one-way (inbound only) system, readings bubble up from end devices (such as meters), through the communication infrastructure, to a master station which publishes the readings. A one-way system might be lower-cost than a two-way system, but it is difficult to reconfigure should the operating environment change.

In a two-way system (supporting both outbound and inbound), commands can be broadcast out from the master station to end devices (meters) – allowing for reconfiguration of the network, or to obtain readings, or to convey messages, etc. The device at the end of the network may then respond (inbound) with a message that carries the desired value. Outbound messages injected at a utility substation will propagate to all points downstream. This type of broadcast allows the communication system to simultaneously reach many thousands of devices—all of which are known to have power and have been previously identified as candidates for load shedding. PLC also may be a component of a smart grid.

== Medium frequency (100 kHz) ==
These systems are often used in countries in which it is illegal to transmit signals that interfere with normal radio.

=== Home control (narrowband) ===
Power-line communications technology can use the electrical power wiring within a home for home automation: for example, remote control of lighting and appliances without installation of additional control wiring.

Typically, home-control power-line communication devices operate by modulating a carrier wave of between 20 and 200 kHz into the household wiring at the transmitter. The carrier is modulated by digital signals. Each receiver in the system has an address and can be individually commanded by the signals transmitted over the household wiring and decoded at the receiver. These devices may be either plugged into regular power outlets or permanently wired in place. Since the carrier signal may propagate to nearby homes (or apartments) on the same distribution system, these control schemes have a house address that designates the owner. A popular technology known as X10 has been used since the 1970s.

The universal powerline bus, introduced in 1999, uses pulse-position modulation (PPM). The physical layer method is a very different scheme than the X10. LonTalk, part of the LonWorks home automation product line, was accepted as part of some automation standards.

=== Low-speed narrow-band ===
Narrowband power-line communications began soon after electrical service became widespread. Around the year 1922, the first carrier frequency systems began to operate over high-tension lines with frequencies of 15 to 500 kHz for telemetry purposes, and this continues. Consumer products such as baby alarms have been available at least since 1940.

In the 1930s, ripple carrier signaling was introduced on the medium (10–20 kV) and low voltage (240/415 V) distribution systems.

For many years, the search continued for a cheap bi-directional technology suitable for applications such as remote meter reading. French electric power Électricité de France (EDF) prototyped and standardized a system called spread frequency shift keying or S-FSK. (See IEC 61334) It is now a simple, low-cost system with a long history; however, it has a very slow transmission rate. In the 1970s, the Tokyo Electric Power Company ran experiments that reported successful bidirectional operation with several hundred units. As of 2012 the system was widely used in Italy and some other parts of the EU.

S-FSK sends a burst of 2, 4 or 8 tones centered around the time when the AC line passes through zero voltage. In this way, the tones avoid most radio-frequency noise from arcing. (It is common for dirty insulators to arc at the highest point of the voltage, and thus generate a wide-band burst of noise.) To avoid other interference, receivers can improve their signal-to-noise ratio by measuring the power of only the 1 tones, only the 0 tones or the differential power of both. Different districts use different tone pairs to avoid interference. The bit timing is typically recovered from the boundaries between tones, in a way similar to a UART. Timing is roughly centered on the zero crossing with a timer from the previous zero crossing. Typical speeds are 200 to 1200 bits per second, with one bit per tone slot. Speeds also depend on the AC line frequency. The speed is limited by noise and the jitter of the AC line's zero crossing, which is affected by local loads. These systems are usually bidirectional, with both meters and central stations sending data and commands. Higher levels of the protocols can have stations (usually smart meters) retransmit messages. (See IEC 61334)

Since the mid-1980s, there has been a surge of interest in using the potential of digital communications techniques and digital signal processing. The drive is to produce a reliable system that is cheap enough to be widely installed and able to compete cost effectively with wireless solutions. But the narrowband powerline communications channel presents many technical challenges; a mathematical channel model and a survey of work is available.

Applications of mains communications vary enormously, as would be expected of such a widely available medium. One natural application of narrow-band power-line communication is the control and telemetry of electrical equipment such as meters, switches, heaters and domestic appliances. A number of active developments are considering such applications from a systems point of view, such as demand side management. In this, domestic appliances would intelligently coordinate their use of resources, for example, limiting peak loads.

Control and telemetry applications include both utility side applications, which involve equipment belonging to the utility company up to the domestic meter, and consumer-side applications, which involve equipment in the consumer's premises. Possible utility-side applications include automatic meter reading (AMR), dynamic tariff control, load management, load profile recording, credit control, pre-payment, remote connection, fraud detection and network management, and could be extended to include gas and water.

Open Smart Grid Protocol (OSGP) is one of the most proven narrowband PLC technologies and protocols for smart metering. There are, as of 2019, more than five million smart meters, based on OSGP and using BPSK PLC, installed and operating around the world. The OSGP Alliance led an effort to establish a family of specifications published by the European Telecommunications Standards Institute (ETSI) used in conjunction with the ISO/IEC 14908 control networking standard for smart grid applications. OSGP provides a delivery of command and control information for smart meters, direct load control modules, solar panels, gateways, and other smart grid devices. OSGP follows a modern, structured approach based on the OSI protocol model to meet the evolving challenges of the smart grid.

At the physical layer, OSGP currently uses ETSI 103 908 as its technology standard. This uses binary phase shift keying at 3592.98 BAUD, using a carrier tone of 86.232 KHz ± 200 ppm. (Note: The bit clock is almost exactly 1/24 of the carrier.) At the OSGP application layer, ETSI TS 104 001 provides a table-oriented data storage based, in part, on the ANSI C12.19 / MC12.19 / 2012 / IEEE Std 1377 standards for Utility Industry End Device Data Tables and ANSI C12.18 / MC12.18 / IEEE Std 1701, for its services and payload encapsulation. This standard and command system provides not only for smart meters and related data but also for general-purpose extension to other smart grid devices.

A project of EDF, France, includes demand management, street lighting control, remote metering and billing, customer-specific tariff optimization, contract management, expense estimation and gas applications safety.

There are also many specialized niche applications that use the mains supply within the home as a convenient data link for telemetry. For example, in the UK and Europe, a TV audience monitoring system uses powerline communications as a convenient data path between devices that monitor TV viewing activity in different rooms in a home and a data concentrator which is connected to a telephone modem.

=== Medium-speed narrow-band ===
The Distribution Line Carrier (DLC) System technology used a frequency range of 9 to 500 kHz with a data rate up to 576 kbit/s.

A project called Real-time Energy Management via Powerlines and Internet (REMPLI) was funded from 2003 to 2006 by the European Commission.

More modern systems use OFDM to send data at faster bit rates without causing radio frequency interference. These utilize hundreds of slowly-sending data channels. Usually, they can adapt to noise by turning off channels with interference. The extra expense of the encoding devices is minor compared to the cost of the electronics to transmit. The transmission electronics are usually a high-power operational amplifier, a coupling transformer and a power supply. Similar transmission electronics is required on older, slower systems, so with improved technology, improved performance can be very affordable.

In 2009, a group of vendors formed the PoweRline Intelligent Metering Evolution (PRIME) alliance. As delivered, the physical layer is OFDM, sampled at 250 kHz, with 512 differential phase-shift keying channels from 42–89 kHz. Its fastest transmission rate is 128.6 kbit/s, while its most robust is 21.4 kbit/s. It uses a convolutional code for error detection and correction. The upper layer is usually IPv4.

In 2011, several companies including distribution network operators (ERDF, Enexis), meter vendors (Sagemcom, Landis&Gyr) and chip vendors (Maxim Integrated, Texas Instruments, STMicroelectronics, Renesas) founded the G3-PLC Alliance to promote G3-PLC technology. G3-PLC is the low-layer protocol to enable large-scale infrastructure on the electrical grid. G3-PLC may operate on CENELEC A band (35 to 91 kHz) or CENELEC B band (98 kHz to 122 kHz) in Europe, on ARIB band (155 kHz to 403 kHz) in Japan and on FCC (155 kHz to 487 kHz) for the US and the rest of the world. The technology used is OFDM sampled at 400 kHz with adaptive modulation and tone mapping. Error detection and correction are made by both a convolutional code and Reed-Solomon error correction. The required media access control is taken from IEEE 802.15.4, a radio standard. In the protocol, 6loWPAN has been chosen to adapt IPv6, an internet network layer, to the constrained environments of power line communications. 6loWPAN integrates routing, based on the mesh network LOADng, header compression, fragmentation and security. G3-PLC has been designed for extremely robust communication based on reliable and highly secure connections between devices, including crossing Medium Voltage to Low Voltage transformers. With the use of IPv6, G3-PLC enables communication between meters, grid actuators as well as smart objects. In December 2011, G3 PLC technology was recognized as an international standard at ITU in Geneva where it is referenced as G.9903, Narrowband orthogonal frequency division multiplexing power line communication transceivers for G3-PLC networks.

=== Transmitting radio programs ===
Sometimes, PLC was used for transmitting radio programs over power lines. When operated in the AM radio band, it is known as a carrier current system.

== High frequency (≥ 1 MHz) ==
High-frequency communication may (re)use large portions of the radio spectrum for communication, or may use select (narrow) band(s), depending on the technology.

=== Home networking (LAN) ===
Power line communications can also be used in a home to interconnect home computers and peripherals, and home entertainment devices that have an Ethernet port. Powerline adapter sets plug into power outlets to establish an Ethernet connection using the existing electrical wiring in the home (power strips with filtering may absorb the power line signal). This allows devices to share data without the inconvenience of running dedicated network cables.

The widely deployed powerline networking standards are from Nessum Alliance and HomePlug Powerline Alliance. HomePlug Powerline Alliance announced in October 2016 that it would wind down its activities, and the Alliance website (homeplug.org) has been closed. Nessum (formerly HD-PLC), and HomePlug AV, which is the most current of the HomePlug specifications, were adopted by the IEEE 1901 group as baseline technologies for their standard, published 30 December 2010. HomePlug estimates that over 45 million HomePlug devices have been deployed worldwide. Other companies and organizations back different specifications for power line home networking, and these include the Universal Powerline Association, SiConnect, Xsilon, and the ITU-T's G.hn (HomeGrid) specification.

=== Non-home networking (LAN) ===
With the diversification of IoT applications, the demand for high-speed data communication, such as transmission of high-definition video data or high-frequency sensor data, is increasing in the field of smart buildings, smart factories, smart cities, etc. In such use cases, power line communication technologies can also be used and provide the same advantage of reusing existing cables.

Nessum has developed a multi-hop technology that can be used to build large-scale networks. In addition, the latest Nessum technology (4th-generation HD-PLC technology) provides multiple channels, which enable high-speed and long-range communication by selecting the optimal channel.

=== Broadband over power line ===
Broadband over power line (BPL) is a system to transmit two-way data over existing AC MV (medium voltage) electrical distribution wiring between transformers, and AC LV (low voltage) wiring between transformers and customer outlets (typically 100 to 240 V). This avoids the expense of a dedicated network of wires for data communication, and the expense of maintaining a dedicated network of antennas, radios and routers in a wireless network.

BPL uses some of the same radio frequencies used for over-the-air radio systems. Modern BPL employs Wavelet-OFDM, FFT-OFDM, or frequency-hopping spread spectrum to avoid using those frequencies actually in use, though early pre-2010 BPL standards did not. The criticisms of BPL from this perspective are of pre-OPERA, pre-IEEE 1905 standards.

The BPL OPERA standard is used primarily in Europe by ISPs. In North America, it is used in some places (Washington Island, WI, for instance) but is more generally used by electric distribution utilities for smart meters and load management.

Since the ratification of the IEEE 1901 (Nessum, HomePlug) LAN standard and its widespread implementation in mainstream router chipsets, the older BPL standards are not competitive for communication between AC outlets within a building, nor between the building and the transformer where MV meets LV lines.

== Ultra-high frequency (≥ 100 MHz) ==
Even higher information rate transmissions over power line use RF through microwave frequencies transmitted via a transverse mode surface wave propagation mechanism that requires only a single conductor. An implementation of this technology is marketed as E-Line. These use microwaves instead of the lower frequency bands, up to 2–20 GHz. While these may interfere with radio astronomy when used outdoors, the advantages of speeds competitive with fiber optic cables without new wiring are likely to outweigh that.

These systems claim symmetric and full duplex communication in excess of 1 Gbit/s in each direction. Multiple Wi-Fi channels with simultaneous analog television in the 2.4 and 5.0 GHz unlicensed bands have been demonstrated operating over a single medium voltage line conductor. Because the underlying propagation mode is extremely broadband (in the technical sense), it can operate anywhere in the 20 MHz to 20 GHz region. Also, since it is not restricted to below 80 MHz, as is the case for high-frequency BPL, these systems can avoid the interference issues associated with the use of shared spectrum with other licensed or unlicensed services.

== Standards ==
Two distinctly different sets of standards apply to powerline networking as of early 2010.

Within homes, the IEEE 1901 standards specify how, globally, existing AC wires should be employed for data purposes. The IEEE 1901 includes Nessum and HomePlug AV as baseline technologies. Any IEEE 1901 products can coexist and be fully interoperable between products using the same technology. On the other hand, medium-frequency home control devices remain divided, although X10 tends to be dominant. For power grid use, IEEE approved a low-frequency (≤ 500 kHz) standard called IEEE 1901.2 in 2013.

Several competing organizations have developed specifications, including the HomePlug Powerline Alliance (defunct), Universal Powerline Association (defunct), and Nessum Alliance (active). In October 2009, the ITU-T adopted Recommendation G.hn/G.9960 as a standard of networks for high-speed powerline, coax, and phoneline communications. The National Energy Marketers Association (a US trade body) was also involved in advocating for standards.

In July 2009, the IEEE Power Line Communication Standards Committee approved its draft standard for broadband over power lines. The IEEE 1901 final standard was published on 30 December 2010, and included features from HomePlug and Nessum. Power line communication via IEEE 1901 and IEEE 1905 compliant devices is indicated by the nVoy certification, which all major vendors of such devices committed to in 2013. NIST has included IEEE 1901 (Nessum, HomePlug AV) and ITU-T G.hn as "Additional Standards Identified by NIST Subject to Further Review" for the Smart grid in the United States. IEEE also came up with a low-frequency standard for long-distance smart grids called IEEE 1901.2 in 2013.

== Applications ==
PLC technology is widely used in the following systems to empower Smart Building, Smart Factory, Smart Grid, and Smart City, etc., as a solution to reduce network construction costs.

- Advanced Metering Infrastructure (AMI) systems
- Micro-inverters
- HVAC systems
- Elevators
- Storage batteries
- Smart streetlights
- Lighting control systems
- Intercom systems
- Security camera systems

== Challenges ==
The primary challenge with the PLC to date is the unshielded and untwisted power wiring. This type of wiring releases significant radio energy, potentially disrupting others using the same frequency band. Additionally, the BPL (Broadband over Power Line) systems may experience interference from the radio signals produced by the PLC wiring.

For home networks relying on powerline communication technology, how to deal with electrical noise injected into the system from standard household appliances remains the largest challenge. Whenever any appliance is turned on or turned off, it creates noise that could possibly disrupt data transfer through the wiring. IEEE products that are certified to be HomePlug 1.0 compliant have been engineered to no longer interfere with, or receive interference from, other devices plugged into the same home's electrical grid.

== See also ==
- HomePNA
- IEEE 1675-2008
- KNX (standard)
- List of broadband over power line deployments
- Multimedia over Coax Alliance
- National Emergency Alarm Repeater
- Residential gateway
