= Peter Rawlinson =

Peter Rawlinson may refer to:

- Peter Rawlinson, Baron Rawlinson of Ewell (1919–2006), British politician, barrister, and author
- Peter Rawlinson (engineer), Welsh-born engineer for Lucid Motors

== See also ==
- Rawlinson
