= Thomas Rawlinson =

Thomas Rawlinson may refer to:

- Thomas Rawlinson (1647–1708), London winemaker, Lord Mayor of London 1705
- Thomas Rawlinson (barrister) (1681–1725), English barrister and bibliophile
- Thomas Rawlinson (industrialist), 18th-century English industrialist controversially reputed to have invented the modern kilt
- Thomas Rawlinson (died 1769), Lord Mayor of London 1753
- Thomas Rawlinson (politician) (1847–1928), English-born Australian politician

== See also ==
- Rawlinson
