= Derek Jenkins =

American automobile designer

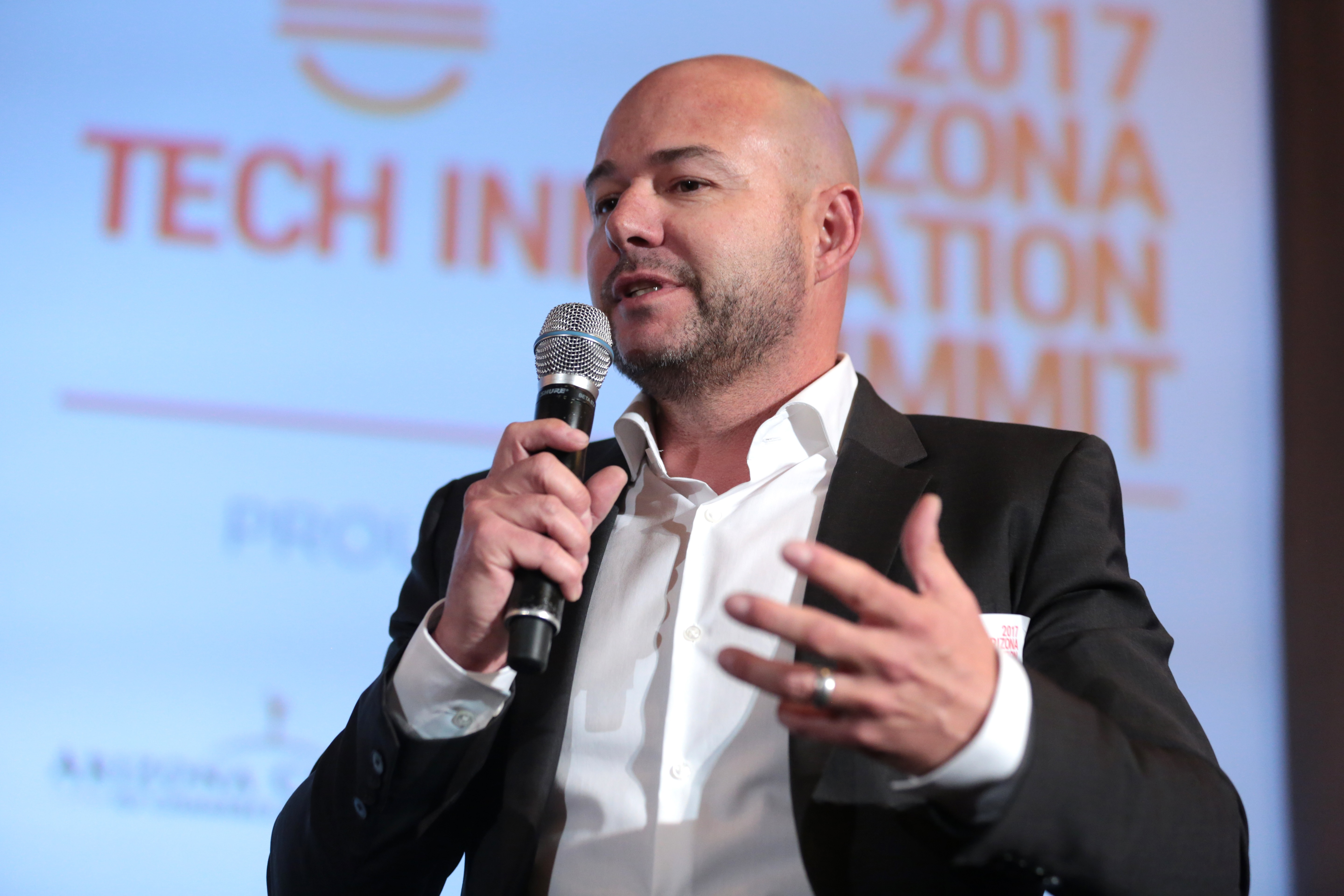
- Jenkins in 2017
- Born: California, United States
- Education: B.S. (ArtCenter College of Design)
- Occupation: Automobile designer
- Employer(s): Senior Vice President of Design and Brand at Lucid Motors
- Known for: Mazda Miata; Lucid Motors

Derek Jenkins is an American automobile designer. He is currently the senior vice president of design and brand at Lucid Motors. He is known for his contribution to the design of the Mazda MX-5 (fourth generation) as well as the Lucid Air.

== Biography ==
Jenkins was born in California. He attended the ArtCenter College of Design, where he received a Bachelor of Science in transportation design.

Jenkins spent eight years with Audi, serving first as lead exterior designer, followed by assistant chief designer for Audi Design. He was the principal exterior designer of the A2 concept and production cars, as well as the 2002 Audi A8. Jenkins then spent nine years as the chief designer for Volkswagen North America, where he is credited with several vehicles including the Scirocco concept, Ragster, Microbus concept, VW GX3 and Concept T.

Jenkins then became director of design at Mazda North America Operations, where he oversaw all design developments locally and globally. He was the lead designer of the Mazda MX-5 (fourth generation), which was the World Car of the Year and World Car Design of the Year in 2016. He was the lead or contributing designer to the Shinari concept, CX-5, Mazda6, Mazda3, and the 2017 CX-9.

In 2015, Jenkins left Mazda to join Lucid Motors (at the time named Atieva). As the senior vice president of design and brand, he oversees all design developments, including exterior and interior design, user experience, color and material, accessories, and the overall design strategy, along with Peter Rawlinson. Jenkins also leads Lucid's brand creative and brand strategy.
