= Nuro =

American robotics company

Nuro, Inc.
- Type: Private
- Industry: Robotics
- Founded: 2016; 10 years ago
- Founders: Jiajun Zhu; Dave Ferguson
- Headquarters: Mountain View, California, United States
- Key people: Jiajun Zhu (Co-CEO); Dave Ferguson (Co-CEO)
- Number of employees: 700 (2025)
- Website: nuro.ai

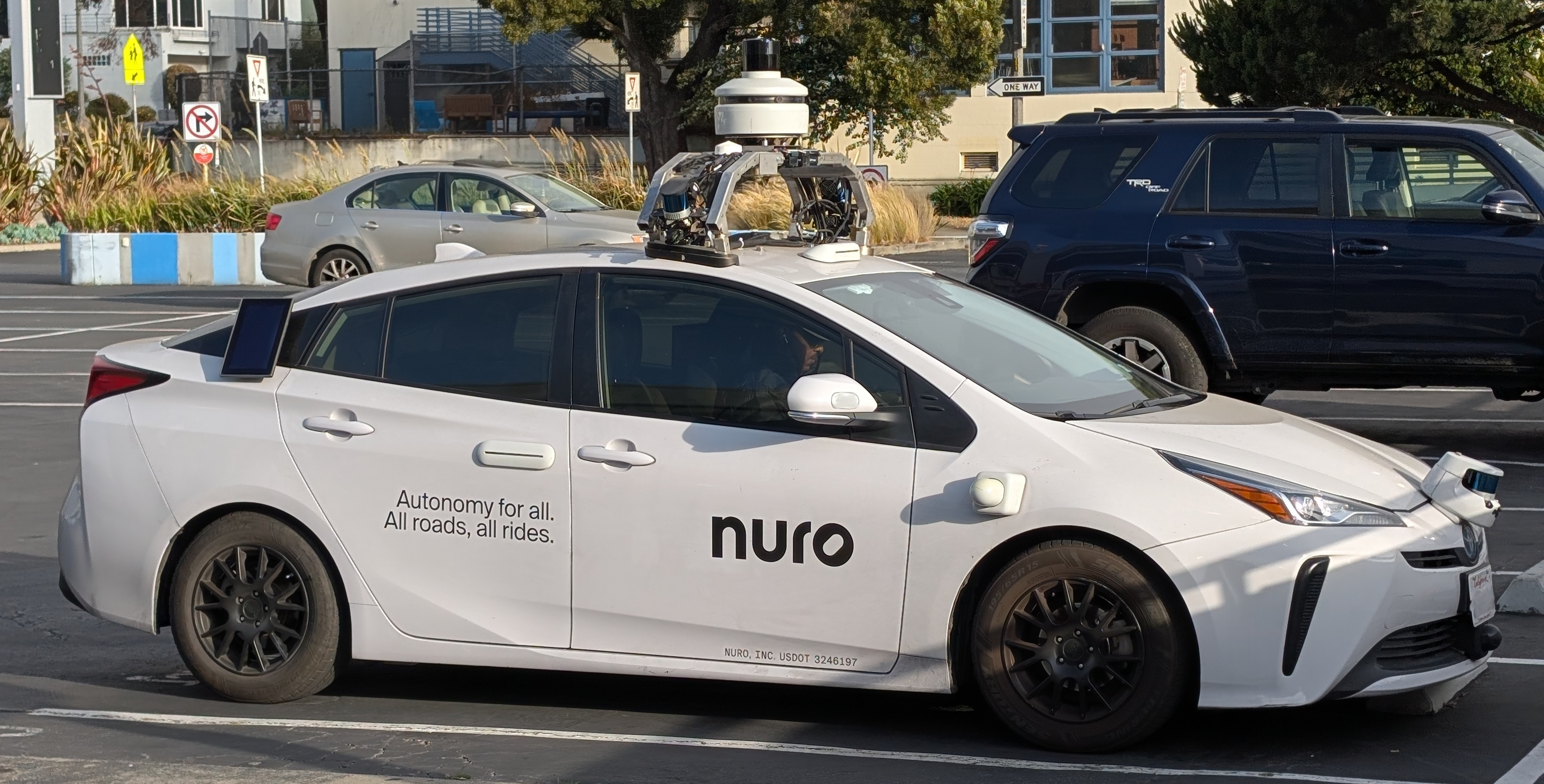
A Nuro P2 test car in San Francisco (2025)

Nuro, Inc. is an American autonomous vehicle technology company based in Mountain View, California. Founded in 2016 by Jiajun Zhu and Dave Ferguson, Nuro initially developed custom autonomous delivery vehicles and became the first company to receive an autonomous exemption from the National Highway Traffic Safety Administration (NHTSA). Since September 2024, the company has focused on licensing its proprietary Level 4 driving system, Nuro Driver, to automakers and mobility providers.

== History ==
The company was founded by engineers of Google's self-driving car project, Waymo. Jiajun Zhu served as the principal software engineer and Dave Ferguson joined in 2011 as the principal machine learning engineer. Both left Waymo in 2016 and founded Nuro that September.

Nuro officially launched and showcased its first product, an electric self-driving local commerce delivery vehicle, in January 2018 with $92 million in funding from Greylock Partners and Gaorong Capital. Known as the R1, it weighed 1,500 pounds (680 kg) and was just over 6 feet (1.8 m) tall, about half the width of a sedan. This vehicle was designed to carry only cargo, with space for 12 grocery bags in the first model.

In June 2018, Nuro announced its first partnership with Kroger to test the fully autonomous delivery of groceries.

The pilot launched on August 16, 2018, in Scottsdale, Arizona at a Fry's Food and Drug store. Initially, self-driving Toyota Prius cars were used for the pilot. On December 18, 2018, the R1 was officially launched into the pilot.

In February 2019, Nuro raised $940 million from SoftBank Group, which valued the company at $2.7 billion.

On June 17, 2019, Nuro announced its partnership with Domino's Pizza to launch in Houston later that year.

In February 2020, Nuro began testing the R2, the second generation of self-driving vehicles, in Houston, Texas. In April 2020, Nuro announced that the R2 prototype was being used to transport medical supplies around medical facilities in California. The R2 was designed with no steering wheel, side view mirrors, or pedals.

The company began prescription delivery through CVS Pharmacy in May 2020. In November 2020, Nuro announced that they raised $500 million in their Series C funding round led by T. Rowe Price, with a post-money valuation of $5 billion.

In December 2020, Nuro acquired self-driving trucking startup Ike Robotics. Over 55 Ike employees joined Nuro's staff after the acquisition.

In August 2021, Nuro announced that it would spend $40 million on the construction of a manufacturing facility and test track for its self-driving robot vehicles, located in southern Nevada. In December 2021, Nuro announced a partnership to commercially deliver 7-Eleven goods.

In September 2022, Uber and Nuro announced a 10-year partnership for autonomous food deliveries, starting in California and Texas. In November 2022, Nuro laid off 20 percent of its staff, or approximately 300 employees. In May 2023, Nuro paused commercial expansion to focus on autonomy systems and laid off 30 percent of its staff, or approximately 340 employees.

In February 2024, the company launched a collaboration with Arm Holdings to develop its third-generation autonomous delivery vehicle. Nuro announced its business model pivot in September 2024, shifting towards technology licensing.

In April 2025, Nuro opened a $106 million Series E funding round. In August 2025, it closed the Series E round with an additional $97 million of funding.

In July 2025, a partnership was established between Nuro, Uber, and Lucid Motors to launch a robotaxi fleet. Uber was to purchase and operate Lucid Gravity SUV vehicles outfitted with Nuro Driver autonomous driving technology. The partnership anticipated launching its first vehicle in 2026, with plans to deploy at least 20,000 robotaxis over the next six years.

In August 2025, Nuro raised $203 million at a $6 billion valuation from investors Uber and Nvidia, alongside returning backers, in its late-stage funding round.

== Nuro Driver ==
In September 2024, Nuro launched its new business model, licensing its AI-based, self-driving Nuro Driver software technology to automakers, suppliers and mobility providers. Nuro Driver is capable of enabling up to Level 4 robotaxis, personally owned autonomous vehicles, and driverless goods delivery.

Nuro Driver expanded its L4 driverless capabilities using zero-occupant vehicles in November 2024.

In April 2025, Nuro expanded to Japan, officially launching Nuro’s first international data-collection initiative. The deployment will allow Nuro Driver to improve its AI model through local traffic dynamics.

Nuro began on-road autonomous testing on the Las Vegas Strip in May 2025.

== See also ==
- Waymo
- Mobileye
