= Rawlinson =

Rawlinson may refer to:

- Alan Rawlinson (1918–2007), Australian flying ace
- Sir Alfred Rawlinson, 3rd Baronet (1867–1934), English soldier, aviator and Olympic sportsman
- Alfred Rawlinson (bishop) (1884–1960), Bishop of Derby, 1935–1959
- Arthur Richard Rawlinson (1894–1984), British Lieutenant-Colonel and screenwriter
- Edward Rawlinson (1912–1992), Canadian businessman
- George Rawlinson (1812–1902), English scholar and historian
- Sir Henry Rawlinson, 1st Baronet (1810–1895), British diplomat and orientalist
- Sir Henry Rawlinson, a fictional character created by Vivian Stanshall
- Henry Rawlinson, 1st Baron Rawlinson (1864–1925), British general
- Jana Rawlinson (born 1982), Australian athlete previously known as Jana Pittman
- John Rawlinson (politician) (1860–1926), English barrister and member of parliament
- Johnnie B. Rawlinson (born 1952), United States federal judge
- Mary C. Rawlinson, American philosophy professor
- Peter Rawlinson, Baron Rawlinson of Ewell (1919–2006), British politician, barrister, and author
- Peter Rawlinson (engineer), Welsh-born engineer for Lucid Motors
- Richard Rawlinson (1690–1755), English minister and antiquarian
- Robert Rawlinson (1810–1898), English civil engineer
- Thomas Rawlinson (disambiguation), several people

== Other ==
- Rawlinson Road, Oxford, England
- NPS Rawlinson Roadway, a typeface used by the United States National Park Service
- Peter Rawlinson Award, an Australian environmental prize established in 2001
