= Peter Rawlinson (engineer) =

Welsh businessman, engineer, and former CEO/CTO of Lucid Motors based in California

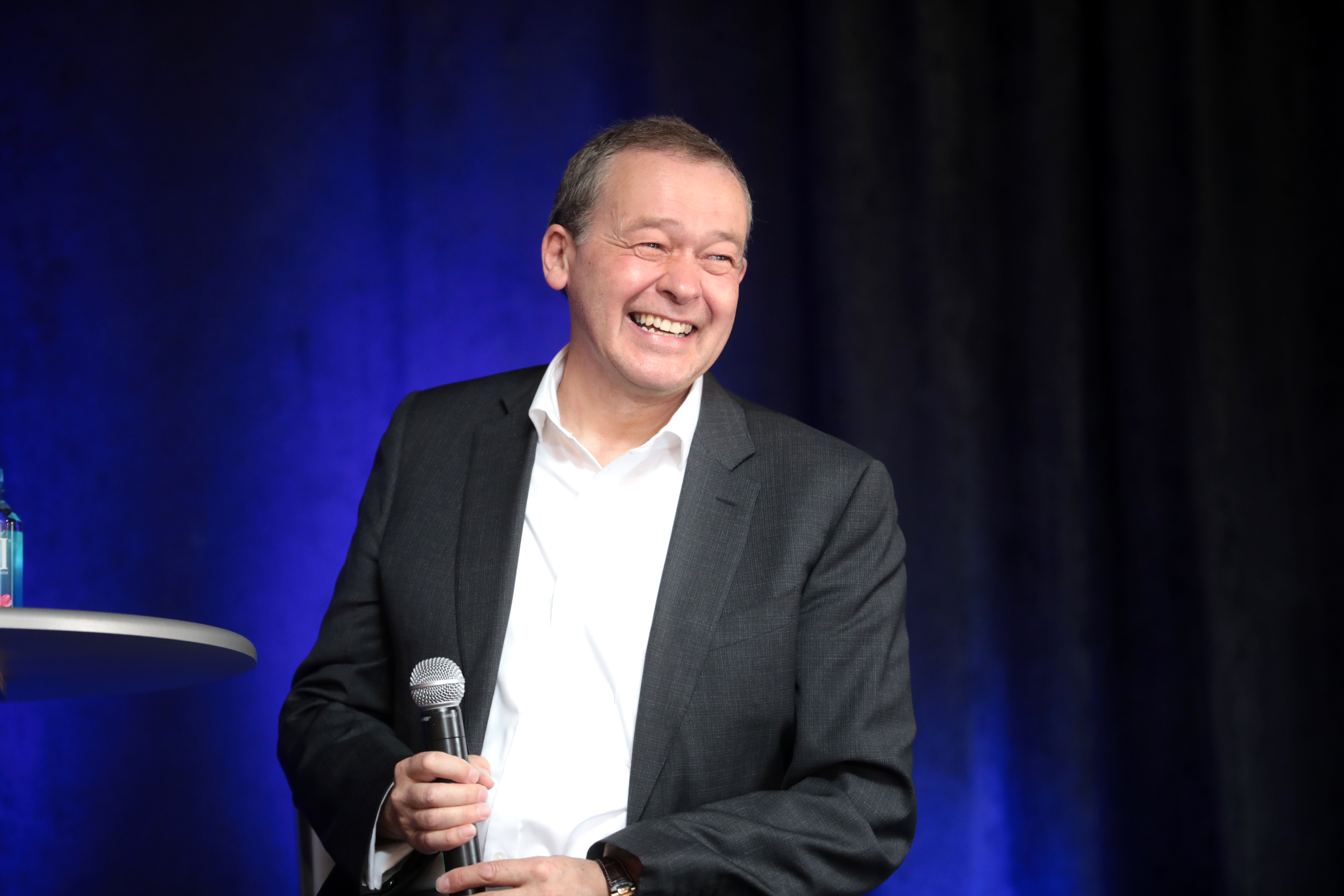
- Rawlinson in 2019
- Born: 1957 (age 68–69)
- Education: Imperial College London
- Occupations: Ex CEO and CTO of Lucid Motors
- Known for: Tesla Model S, Lucid Motors

Peter Rawlinson (born 1957) is a British businessman and engineer based in California. He was the chief executive officer, chief technology officer, and former board member of Lucid Motors and is known for his work as Chief Vehicle Engineer of the Tesla Model S and the Lucid Air.

== Early life and education ==
Rawlinson was born in 1957 and grew up in Bonvilston, South Wales and attended Cowbridge Grammar School in the Vale of Glamorgan. He considered going to art school before deciding to become an engineer. Rawlinson attended Imperial College London, graduating from the Department of Mechanical Engineering in 1979.

== Career ==
Rawlinson has held several positions in the UK automotive industry, including Principal Engineer at Jaguar Cars, Chief Engineer at Lotus Cars and Head of Vehicle Engineering at Corus Automotive. Rawlinson was one of the first people in the UK to use computer-aided design (CAD) and computer-aided engineering (CAE); in the 1980s, his team created Jaguar's first intranet to transfer engineering files from computer to computer.

Rawlinson joined Tesla in February 2009 as vice president and Chief Vehicle Engineering of Tesla Model S. One week after joining, he told his boss, Elon Musk, that the early Model S prototype was a "false dawn" and that Rawlinson's 6-person team would have to restart the engineering work on Tesla's flagship vehicle from a "clean sheet."

Rawlinson was responsible for the technical execution and delivery of the Model S, improving structure and production by taking advantage of the fewer restrictions facilitated by electric vehicle drivetrain. At Tesla, Rawlinson built a team of 150 engineers and drew upon his knowledge of computational prototyping, digital wind tunnels and other CAD and CAE work from his advanced engineering work in the UK. Rawlinson said that, from 2009 to 2012, "Tesla was truly at the cutting edge, developing the most advanced technology with clarity, a vision and purpose, and an absolute singularity of mindset.” He resigned his position at Tesla in January 2012 to move back home to the UK and care for his aging mother.

Rawlinson helped launch Lucid Motors in 2016 as the Chief Technology Officer and was appointed chief executive officer in 2019. He oversees the development of the Lucid Air and Lucid Gravity. His goal is to make Lucid a "major volume player," including the planned late 2024 launch of an electric SUV and a planned 2026 launch of a mid-sized sedan. His name is on dozens of patents for battery technology or other innovations, and Rawlinson oversaw Lucid's development of the battery used by all the teams in the Formula E electric-vehicle racing circuit. It was announced on 25 February 2025 that Rawlinson would step down as the CEO of Lucid, to be replaced by Marc Winterhoff as the interim CEO for Lucid Motors.
