= Lucid Gravity =

Battery electric mid-size luxury crossover SUV

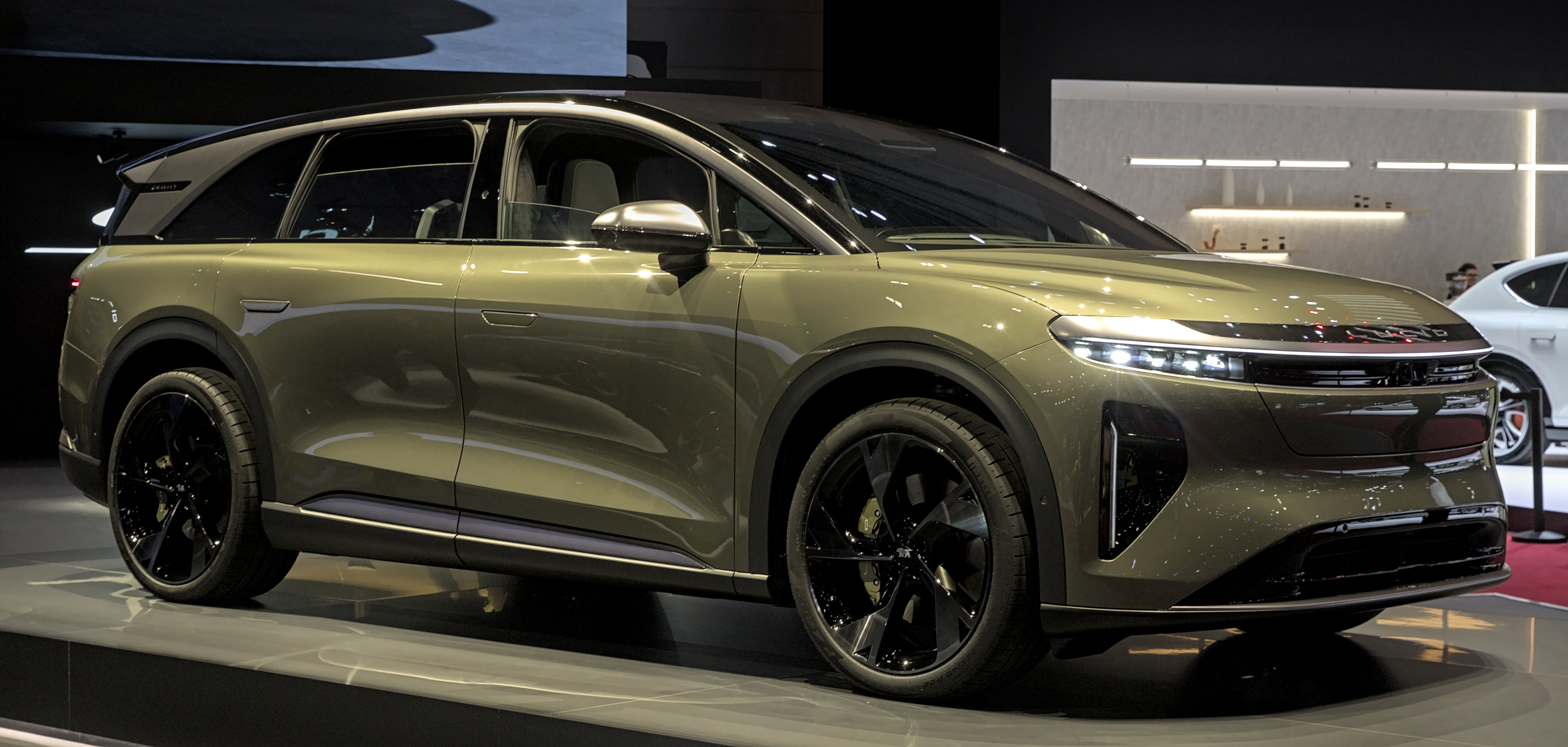

Overview
- Manufacturer: Lucid Motors
- Production: 2024–present
- Model years: 2025–present
- Assembly: United States: Casa Grande, Arizona
- Designer: Derek Jenkins

Body and chassis
- Class: Mid-size luxury crossover SUV (E)
- Body style: 5-door SUV
- Layout: Rear-motor, rear-wheel-drive; Dual-motor, all-wheel-drive; Tri-motor, all-wheel-drive
- Related: Lucid Air

Powertrain
- Power output: 480–828 hp (358–617 kW)
- Transmission: One-speed fixed gear
- Battery: 88, 93, 112 or 118 kWh lithium-ion
- Electric range: Up to 450 miles (720 km)
- Plug-in charging: AC: 19.2 kW AC (240V at 80A); DC: 250 or 300 kW, CCS connector

Dimensions
- Wheelbase: 3,040 mm (119.7 in)
- Length: 5,030 mm (198.0 in)
- Width: 2,000 mm (78.7 in)
- Height: 1,660 mm (65.4 in)
- Curb weight: 2,800 kg (6,173 lb)

The Lucid Gravity is a battery electric mid-size luxury crossover SUV produced by the American company Lucid Motors since late 2024. It is the brand's first SUV and second vehicle overall, and has a multitude of different features and amentities.

== Overview ==
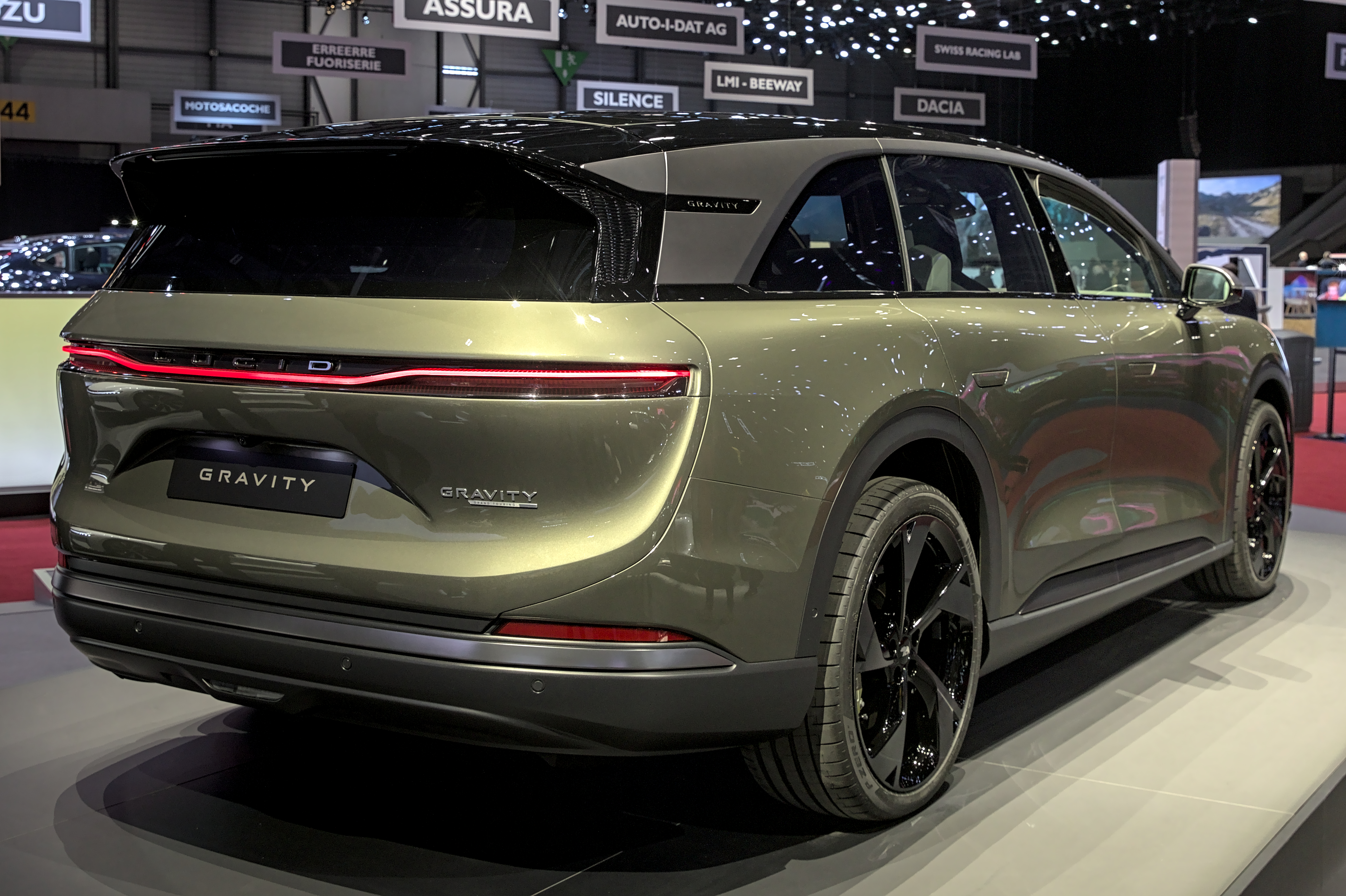
Rear view

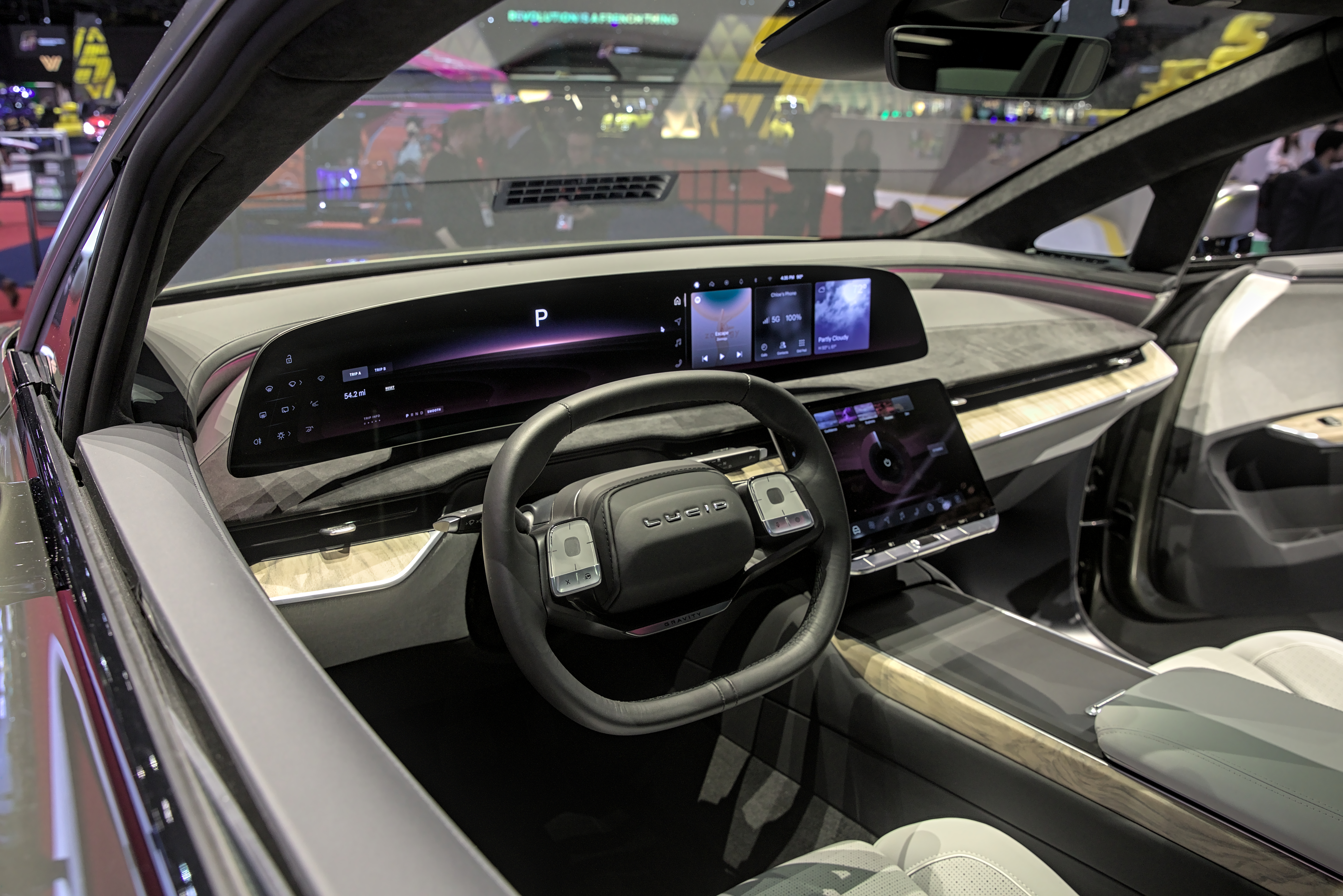
Interior

Already a year before the start of serial production of the first Lucid car, the American startup announced in September 2020 the expansion of its range with another, second model, codenamed Project Gravity. Although the initial styling design and overall concept were already ready, development of the production car took another three years. Ultimately, the official premiere of the Lucid Gravity model took place in the second half of November 2023, positioned as a large, upper-class premium SUV.

The car extensively reproduces the stylistic design and technical solutions of the Lucid Air limousine, adapting key styling features to the massive, stocky proportions of the SUV type. The front fascia features distinctive narrow lighting strips, covered by a large chrome strip running the entire width of the vehicle. A narrow full-width light strip is located on the trunk lid, which, thanks to the absence of fender lamps, has been widened, making access to the trunk easier. The bodywork is abundantly illuminated, enhanced by the fully glazed roof standard on all versions.

The Gravity offers a wide range of passenger cabin configurations, with the ability to accommodate up to seven people in three rows of seats, with an optional six-seat or five-seat configuration across two rows. The spacious rear cargo area allows for up to 3,100 liters of luggage with the top two rows folded down. An additional trunk is also located under the hood, which opens with the bumper to act as a bench. The dashboard expands on the Lucid Air concept, featuring a curved 34-inch panel in front of the driver, which serves as a digital instrument cluster and multimedia system. Furthermore, an additional screen is located lower in the center console, providing shortcuts to key functions and tilting to provide access to additional storage.

== Specifications ==
The Gravity is a fully electric car with a 120 kWh battery that allows for a range of approximately 708 kilometers on a single charge. A drag coefficients of 0.24 Cd facilitated this performance. In the top-of-the-line version, the car is expected to accelerate to 100 km/h in 3.5 seconds with 800 hp.

== Safety ==
Euro NCAP test results Lucid Gravity Grand Touring (LHD) (2025)
Test	Points	%
Overall:	5 /5 stars	
Adult occupant:	33.5	83%
Child occupant:	46.0	93%
Pedestrian:	50.6	80%
Safety assist:	15.3	85%

== Marketing ==
To promote the Gravity, Lucid released the short film "Driven" directed by James Mangold and starring Timothée Chalamet and Larsen Thompson, as well as a marketing campaign with Chalamet, who is the carmaker's first brand ambassador.
