= Thomas Rawlinson (industrialist) =

English industrialist reputed to have invented the kilt

Thomas Rawlinson was an 18th-century English industrialist who some sources have claimed was the inventor of the modern kilt. He was the managing partner in the Invergarry ironworks and rebuilt Invergarry Castle which had been burned down by Col. Clayton following the Jacobite rebellion.

Born in 1669, Thomas Rawlinson was the son of Thomas Rawlinson of Greythwaite. The family were Quaker ironmasters, his father and brother being partners in the Backbarrow Company which successfully developed charcoal blast furnaces at Backbarrow and Leighton. He died in 1737 shortly after the closure of Invergarry furnace

== Invergarry Furnace ==
An agreement was signed on 23 March 1727 to lease John MacDonell's woodland for 31 years. Thomas Rawlinson was to be managing partner with a salary of £100 a year. His eight partners included his father and brother as well as other members of the Backbarrow Company but Thomas was said to have no previous experience of the industry. Iron lintels were cast at Backbarrow and sandstone for the hearth and furnace lining were shipped from Heysham and Whitehaven. Ore was shipped from Furness. Many of the skilled workers were brought in from England and the colliers were Irish. The furnace was blown in on 25 August 1729 but the iron was not of the desired quality. Beams and lintels were cast for General Wade but he declined to pay for them. There were also thieves. Fell quotes an unspecified source "plunder was the passion, the trade, the romance of the Highlander.....robbery was held to be a calling, not merely innocent but honourable." A man was killed attempting to defend the smith. The murderer was a local smith enraged that his work was taken by an incomer. He was hanged in irons. The furnace was blown out on 9 February 1736. The immediate cause was a shortage of ore but by then it was clearly uneconomic.

== The origins of the modern kilt ==
Prior to the turn of the 18th century, the form of the kilt typically worn in the Scottish Highlands was what is now known as the belted plaid or great kilt, which consisted of a large tartan or multi-coloured blanket or wrap (Gaelic felie, with various spellings) which was gathered into loose pleating and drawn about the body and secured by a belt at the waist, the lower part hanging down covering the legs to about the knee.

Sometime in the late 17th century or, at the latest, the early part of the 18th century, a new form of this garment was introduced and became popular. This new form consisted essentially of the lower portion only of the great kilt, at first untailored, but many years later with the pleats or belt loops sewn in to better secure the garment about the waist.

After the repeal of the Act of Proscription, interest attached as to the origins of this new garment, called the little kilt (Gaelic: felie-beg, Anglicized to philabeg, again with various spellings). In a letter published in Edinburgh Magazine for March 1785, but claimed by partisan sources as supposedley written some years earlier, in 1768, Ivan Baillie of Aberiachan, Esq., a known promoter of political union with England and to be anti-Highland, asserted that the new form of the kilt was the creation of Thomas Rawlinson, an entrepreneur who had established an iron works in the Highlands (specifically, in woodland at Invergarry, near Fort William, Invernessshire).

According to Baillie, Rawlinson, observing how the great kilt was "a cumbersome unwieldy habit to men at work" decided to "abridge the dress, and make it handy and convenient for his workmen". This he did by directing the usage of the lower, pleated portion only, the upper portion being detached and set aside.

== Controversy ==
The full text of the letter of Ivan Baillie is reproduced in John Telfer Dunbar's History of Highland Dress. Dunbar quotes the letter approvingly, at the same time citing McClintock's Old Irish and Highland Dress in support of the story, stating that "many attempts have been made to produce proof of the little kilt (Gaelic feilidh beag) before that date [i.e., before about 1725] but nothing so far published can substantiate such claims." He goes on to say that "some of the most popular 'evidence' has been examined and refuted in McClintock ...."

However, since the publication of Dunbar's book, the Baillie version of events has been disputed. Matthew Newsome, director emeritus of the Scottish Tartans Museum in North Carolina, for instance, has stated that "... we have numerous illustrations of Highlanders wearing only the bottom part of the belted plaid that date long before Rawlinson ever set foot in Scotland", going on to assert that "there is some suggestion of its use in the late seventeenth century, and it was definitely being worn in the early eighteenth century".

Notwithstanding: when Baillie's account was published in the Edinburgh Magazine in March 1785, it was not contradicted, and was on the contrary confirmed by the two greatest authorities on Scottish custom of the time, Sir John Sinclair and John Pinkerton and by the independent testimony of the Glengarry family, whose chief, Ian MacDonnell, was Rawlinson's business partner (see Hugh Trevor-Roper,)

== Growing popularity ==
Following the defeat of the Highland clans at the Battle of Culloden in the Second Jacobite Rebellion, the British parliament banned the wearing of tartan and other symbols of the Scottish Highlanders in the 1746 Dress Act. The Act was repealed in 1782 and, in the decades following, there was a romantic revival of interest in things connected with the Highlands, including their dress.

Sir Walter Scott's novels of Highland adventure were best-sellers, and the Highland Society of London became very influential. The "Highland revival" culminated in the visit of King George IV to Edinburgh in 1822, a pageant in large measure orchestrated by Scott. The actual Highland Scots had become a despised underclass, but British Army generals, aristocracy, and landowners could now be seen wearing kilts and listening to the bagpipes. Queen Victoria first visited the Braemar Society's highland gathering at Invercauld in 1844, later buying nearby Balmoral Castle and becoming the society's patron as the royal family continued to popularise the wearing of the kilt.

== Enduring legacy ==
Though knowledge of Thomas Rawlinson's contribution to Scottish dress was forgotten for the better part of two centuries, the politically driven allegations of his alleged version of the kilt still live on today, and many who wear it are completely oblivious to its possible Industrial Age influences.
