= Lucid Air =

Battery electric full-size luxury sedan

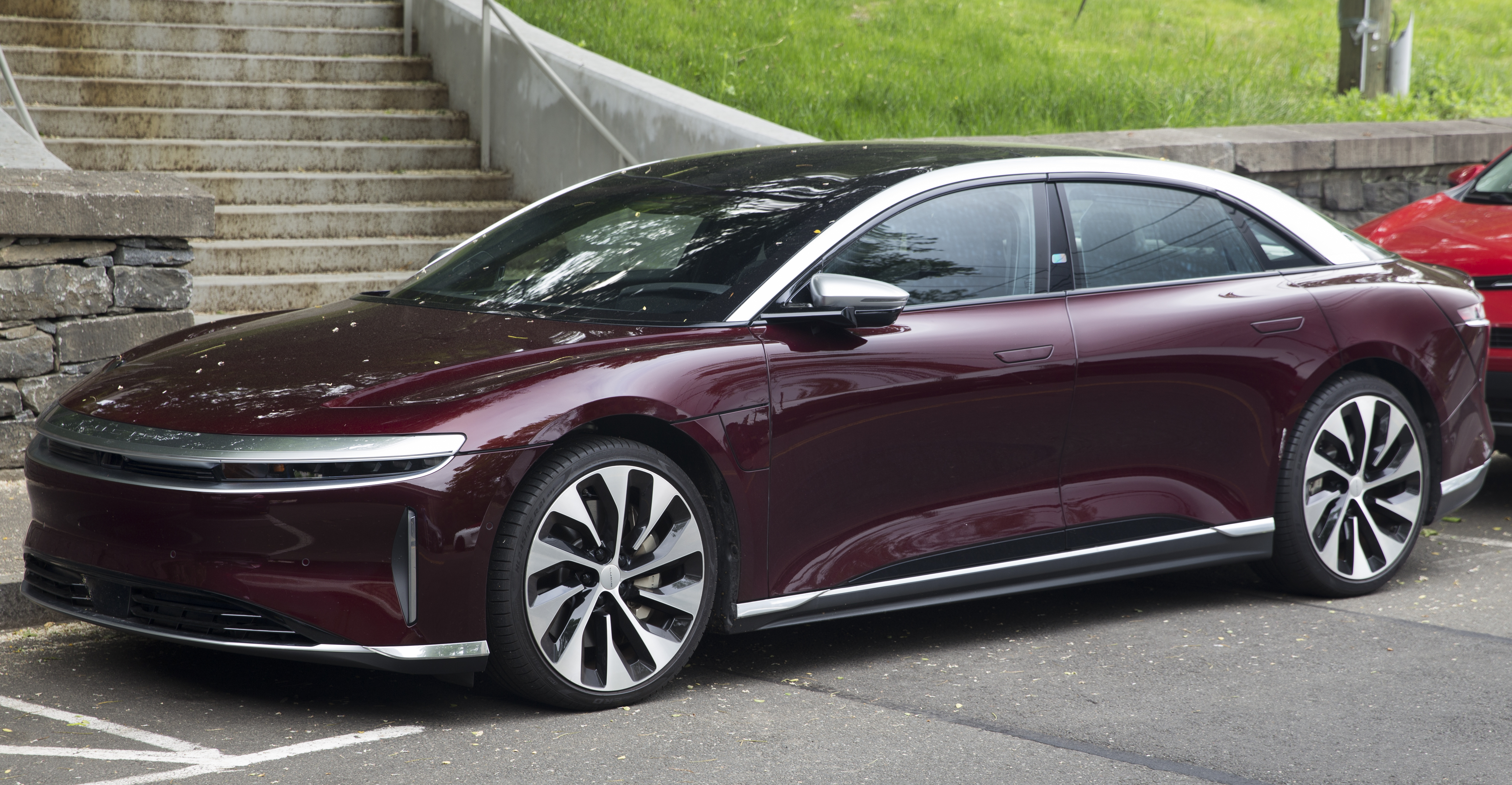
- 2022 Lucid Air Grand Touring in Zenith Red

Overview
- Manufacturer: Lucid Motors
- Production: September 2021 – present
- Model years: 2022–present
- Assembly: United States: Casa Grande, Arizona
- Designer: Derek Jenkins

Body and chassis
- Class: Executive car (E)
- Body style: Four-door sedan
- Layout: Rear-motor, rear-wheel-drive; Dual-motor, all-wheel-drive; Tri-motor, all-wheel-drive
- Related: Lucid Gravity

Powertrain
- Power output: 430–1,234 hp (321–920 kW)
- Transmission: One-speed fixed gear
- Battery: 88, 93, 112 or 118 kWh lithium-ion
- Electric range: Up to 520 miles (840 km)
- Plug-in charging: AC: 19.2 kW AC (240V at 80A); DC: 250 or 300 kW, CCS connector

Dimensions
- Wheelbase: 116.5 in (2,960 mm)
- Length: 195.9 in (4,975 mm)
- Width: 76.3 in (1,939 mm)
- Height: 55.5 in (1,410 mm)
- Curb weight: 4,516–5,336 lb (2,048–2,420 kg)

The Lucid Air is a battery electric four-door luxury sedan produced by Lucid Motors. The vehicle was announced in December 2016 and sales began in 2021 as the brand's first car. It has been positively reviewed by critics and is known for its range and performance capabilities.

The Grand Touring Edition's EPA range is estimated at 512 miles (824 km), the longest for a car on the market as of 2026. The production model was unveiled in September 2020, and production began in late 2021.

In November 2020, the Air Pure was announced with 406 miles (653 km) of range and 480 horsepower (360 kW) and a starting price of US$77,400. The range of trim levels includes Pure, Touring, Grand Touring, and Dream Edition.

On September 28, 2021, Lucid announced that production had begun, with the base Pure model introduced in late 2022. Deliveries commenced on October 30, 2021, with the first reservation holders taking delivery of Air Dream Editions in an event in California.

== History ==
The Air was conceived in the early 2010s, with a prototype unveiled to the public in 2016. The production version was unveiled in September 2020, and production began in 2021.

Lucid contracted with Samsung SDI on December 2, 2016, to supply batteries.

In 2016, Lucid created a delivery van with the prototype of its electric powertrain for the Air using batteries from its former brand, Atieva. Known as "Edna", the delivery van contained two gearboxes, motors producing over 900 hp (670 kW), and an 87 kWh battery pack. Combined with all-wheel drive and other physical and software updates, Edna was able to achieve 0–60 mph (97 km/h) in 2.74 seconds and a 1/4 mile (402 m) in 11.3 seconds. According to Lucid, Edna was used to test the real world performance of its powertrain, including "motor control algorithms, regenerative braking behaviors, accelerator pedal feel, and cooling strategies."

In 2018, a modified Air prototype set an EV lap record of 1:41.67 at the Laguna Seca track, beating the Jaguar I-Pace's previous record of 1:48.18 by seven seconds. The prototype Air was equipped with "Pirelli P Zero PZ4 summer tires, modified high temperature brake pads and fluid, a 6-point roll cage and fire suppression system."

In 2018, Lucid closed a US$1 billion investment deal with Saudi Arabia's Public Investment Fund to fund the Air production. The factory investment is expected to reach US$675 million by 2025 when all phases are complete, with the first phase including a US$168 million investment in equipment and US$82 million to acquire property.

By May 2019, the Air was available for pre-order in the United States and Canada, with plans slated for China. In an interview, CEO Peter Rawlinson stated that China was projected as a significant market for Lucid due to their intensive usage patterns, for which the Air is best suited. As of 2026 Lucid has decoupled from the China market citing competition. Lucid has sourced batteries and final assembly of the Air in Saudi Arabia for the Saudi market.

In a 2019 interview, Rawlinson outlined that the US$100,000-plus vehicle could be the first stage of a much bigger vision, which could achieve a level of energy efficiency that combined with a ubiquitous fast charging network, would counteract the need for larger batteries. Rawlinson said that Lucid aims to improve energy efficiency to 5 mi/kWh (8.0 km/kWh) compared to an industry average of 3 mi/kWh (4.8 km/kWh). Rawlinson further predicted that the price of batteries was expected to drop to US$100 / kWh within the next decade, which he believes will enable Lucid to produce a luxury EV for less than US$30,000.

On June 30, 2020, Lucid said that they expected the Air to be "the world's most aerodynamically efficient luxury car when it goes into production." The company "achieved a new benchmark in aerodynamic efficiency for its luxury electric car … with tests recently completed at Windshear's advanced rolling-road wind tunnel, the automaker verified a coefficient of drag of 0.21."

On May 5, 2022, Lucid announced that it was raising prices of its luxury Air sedan beginning June 1. The price hikes would push the base price of the Air sedan up as much as 13%.

On December 13, 2022, Panasonic and Lucid announced they had entered into multi-year agreements to supply batteries for Lucid's award-winning luxury electric vehicle.

In June 2024, Rawlinson announced that the Air (RWD) had achieved a record efficiency, covering 5 mi/kWh (8.0 km/kWh), up from its prior record-setting 4.7 mi/kWh (7.6 km/kWh).

== Overview ==
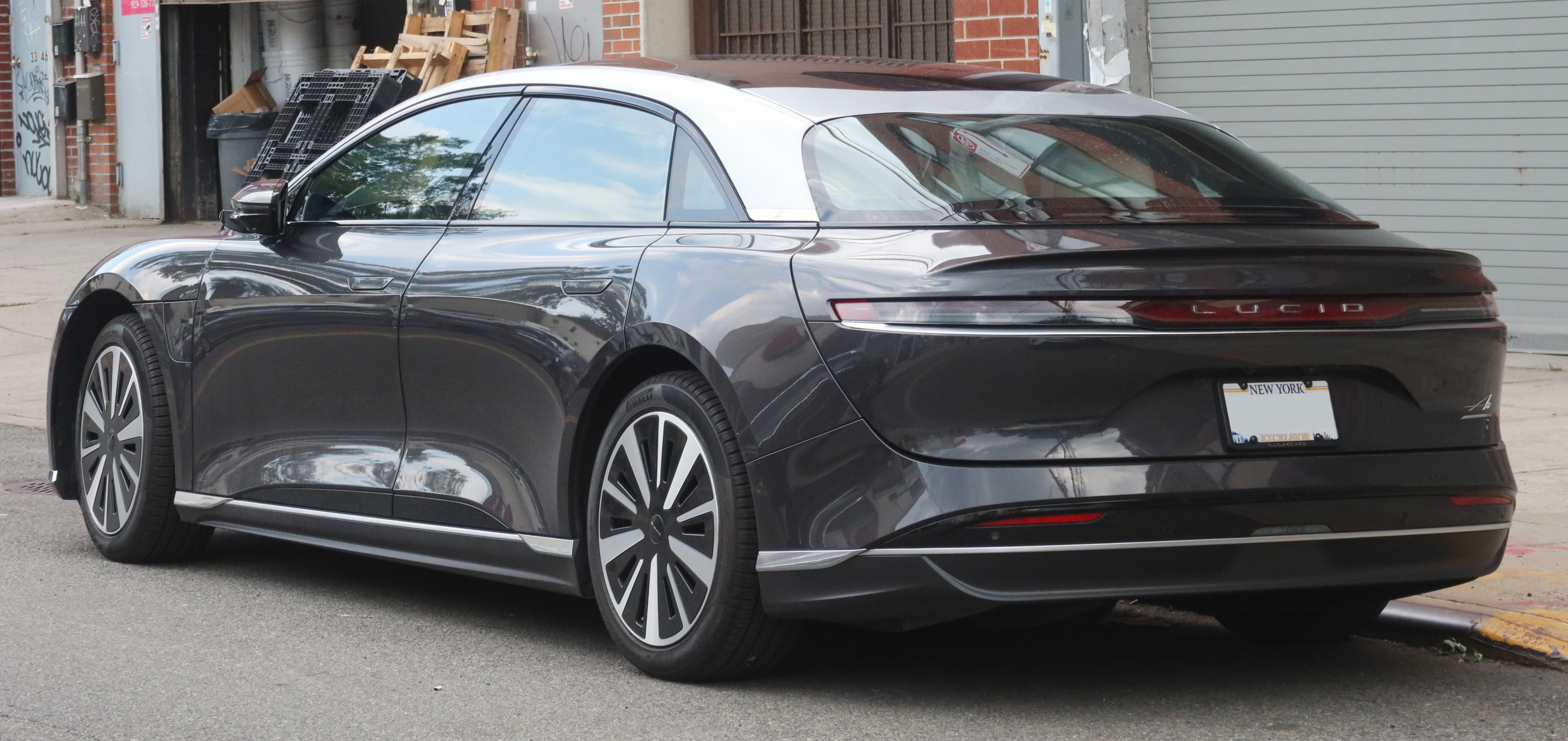
Rear view

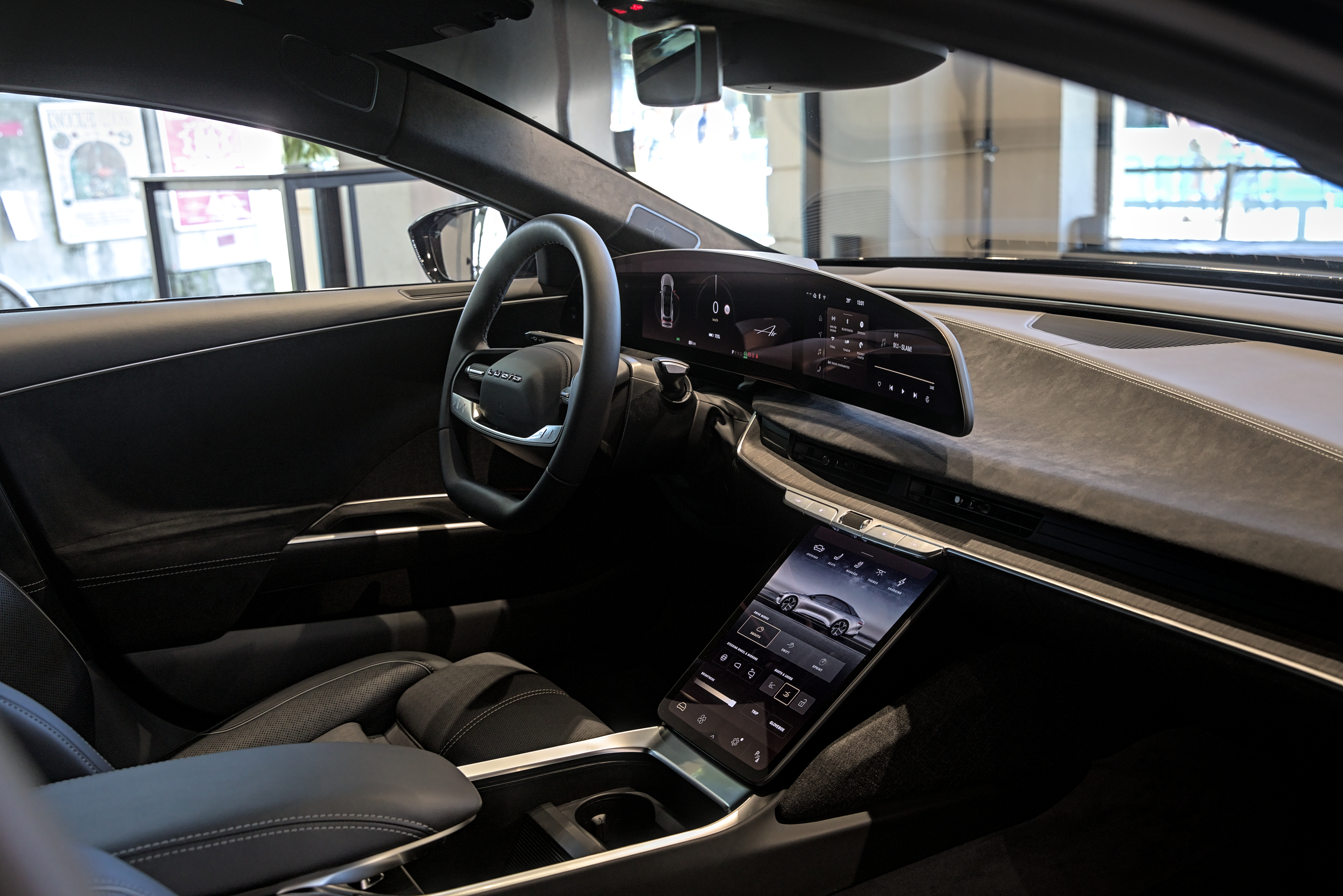
Interior

=== Design ===
The Air has been designed to compete in the luxury sports segment against the Tesla Model S as well as high-line models from German car manufacturers. Its goal is to match the performance capability of sport coupes, with greater interior space and a smaller external length and width. The exterior design was led by Derek Jenkins.

On September 9, 2020, the Air was officially unveiled, and on November 24, 2020, Lucid detailed the full range including the Lucid Air Pure, Touring, Grand Touring, and Dream Edition.

=== Range ===
The Grand Touring Edition's EPA range is up to 512 miles (824 km) with 19-inch wheels, the longest range EV car rated by the EPA.

On November 24, 2020, the company-predicted range for all four models was announced: 406 miles (653 km) for the Air Pure and Air Touring, 503 miles (810 km) for the Air Dream Edition, and 516 miles (830 km) for the Air Grand Touring. A 2022 test drive revealed that the Grand Touring model only managed 410 miles; however, this was still the first EV tested by Car and Driver to top 400 miles. In 2024, the Air broke the Guinness World Record for an EV driving through the most countries with a single charge – crossing 9 countries in 567 miles (912 km).

=== DreamDrive (ADAS) ===
On July 29, 2020, Lucid announced DreamDrive, an Advanced Driver-Assistance System (ADAS) which comes with the Air. The DreamDrive sensor suite has 32 sensors in total, including "14 cameras: Three forward-facing, four side- and rear-facing, four surround-view, a rear-facing, a rear-facing fisheye, and lastly, a driving monitoring one. There are five radar units. One is a forward-facing long-range sensor, and the other four are short-range ones. Twelve short-range ultrasonic sensors handle near-field detection, and lastly, a high-resolution, long-range, 125-beam (equivalent), forward-facing Lidar maps the three-dimensional space ahead of the car."

=== Aerodynamics ===
The pre-production Air has a drag coefficient of Cd=0.21. Later reporting from Motor Trend gives it as Cd=0.20 for the production version. Rawlinson claims the Air has less drag than the Mercedes-Benz EQS due to a smaller frontal area.

=== Powertrain ===
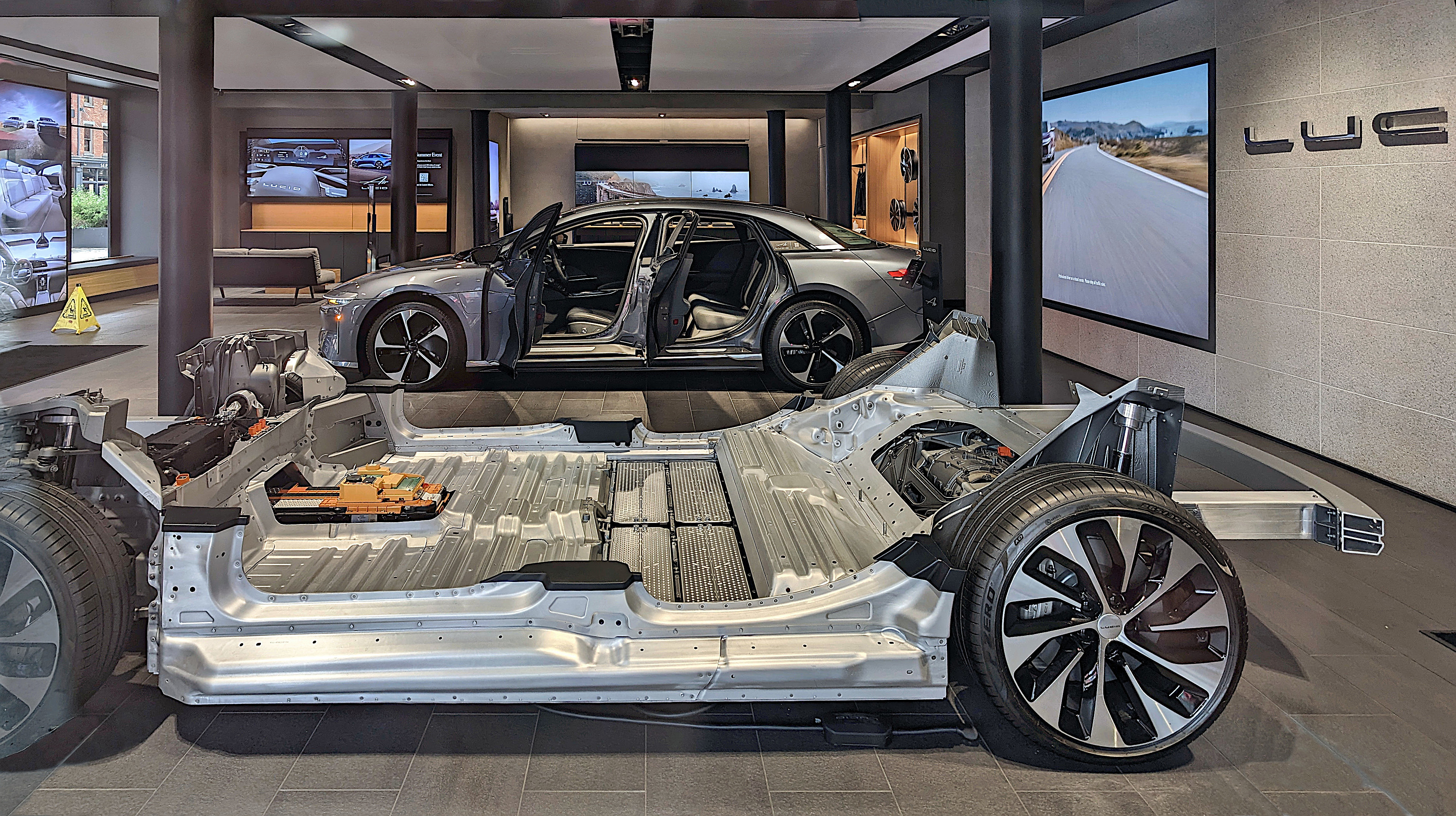
Lucid Air chassis at Lucid Studio in New York City

In February 2020, Lucid announced a partnership with LG Chem through which the latter company would provide battery cells for the Air sedan through 2023.

On December 13, 2022, Panasonic and Lucid announced they had entered into multi-year agreements to supply batteries for Lucid's award-winning luxury electric vehicle.

The entry level Air Pure is equipped with an 88-kWh battery with rear wheel drive, capable of producing 430 hp (321 kW), 600 N⋅m (443 lbf⋅ft) of torque and 406 miles (653 km) of range. The Air Dream Edition Range has a 112 kWh battery pack which provides 520 miles (840 km). The Air Dream Edition Performance has a combined output of 1,111 hp (828 kW) and can accelerate from 0–60 mph (0–97 km/h) in 2.5 seconds. In their most recent performance test, it achieved a top speed of 235 mph (378 km/h).

As of 2021, the most efficient version on sale in the US, the Air Grand Touring with 19-in wheels, has an EPA rated energy efficiency of 26 kWh/100 mi (130 mpg‑e).

Later independent reporting on real-world testing (drag strip performance times) showed the 1,111 hp (828 kW) Air Dream variant achieving a 1/4 mile (402 m) time of 10 seconds flat. The test providers noted that conditions on that particular day were suboptimal (colder than ideal temperature for example), leading them to speculate that 1/4 mile times closer to 9.8 seconds could be achieved under friendlier conditions. In 2025, the Lucid Air Sapphire ran a quarter mile in a time of 9.21 at 157.1 mph, when tested by Motor Trend magazine.

=== Battery and charging ===
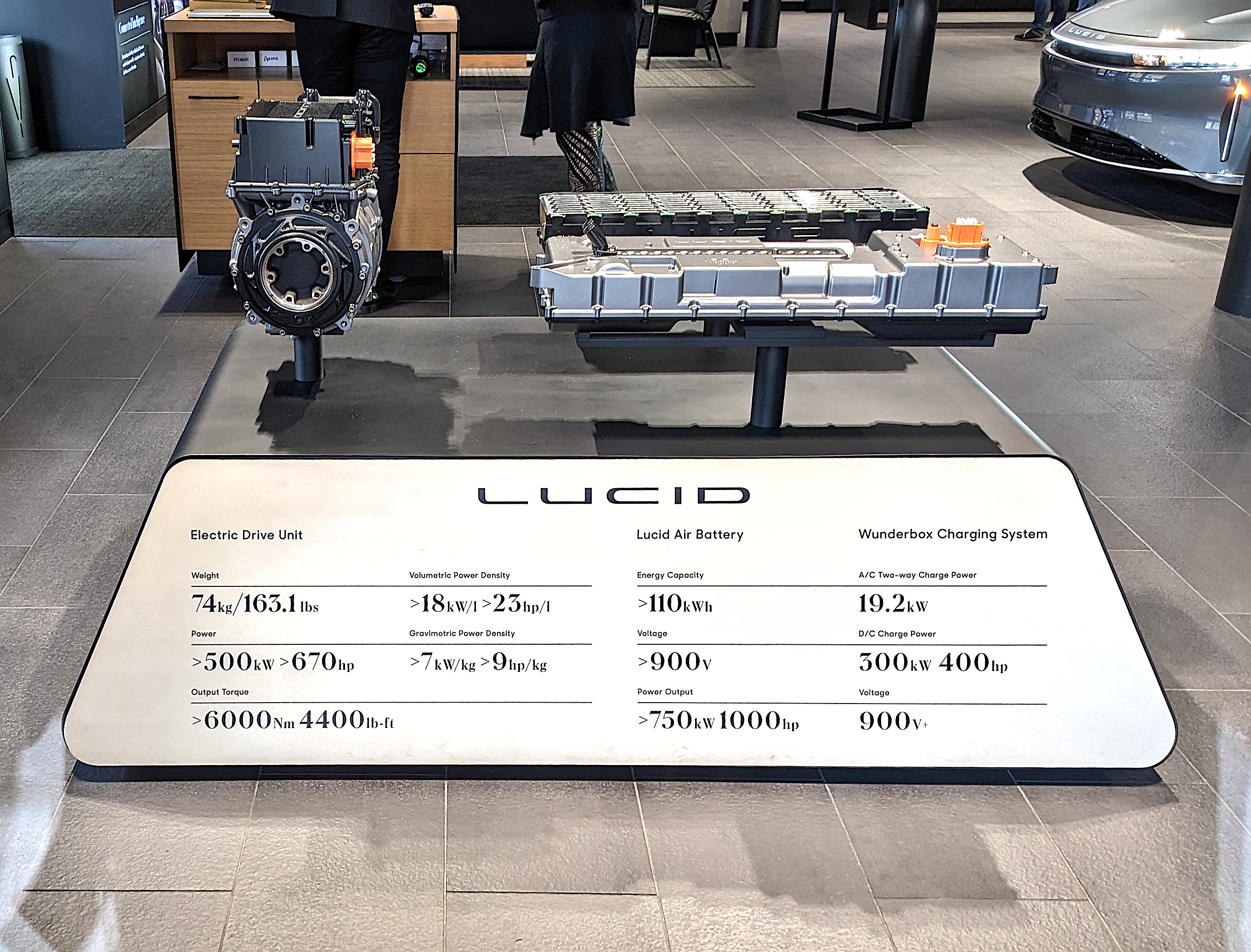
Lucid Air Electric Drive Unit and Battery

Lucid plans to offer a nationwide charging plan to customers in the US through its joint agreement with Electrify America. The 800-volt DC charging system, first used by the Porsche Taycan, allows variable voltages up to 1000 volts, and thus is fully compatible with Lucid's 924-volt electrical architecture.

When used with a 300 kW or higher charging station, the vehicle can gain 300 miles of range in 20 minutes. The vehicle features a bidirectional rectifier capable of supplying up to 19.2 kW (240V ~ 80A) of AC power that could power a home or other load.

It upconverts 400-volt or lower power coming from a charger to its operating voltage. It downconverts the battery pack's 900 volts to 400 volts to power other loads in the vehicle or to charge another vehicle.

The company claims that its 2170 cells differ significantly from normal lithium ion cells due to their tolerance of repeated cyclic fast charging and non-use for a prolonged period of time while maintaining capacity.

The Air is also capable of vehicle-to-vehicle (V2V) charging, but only when using the optional RangeXchange cable in conjunction with the second generation 40A Mobile Charging Cable.

== Features ==
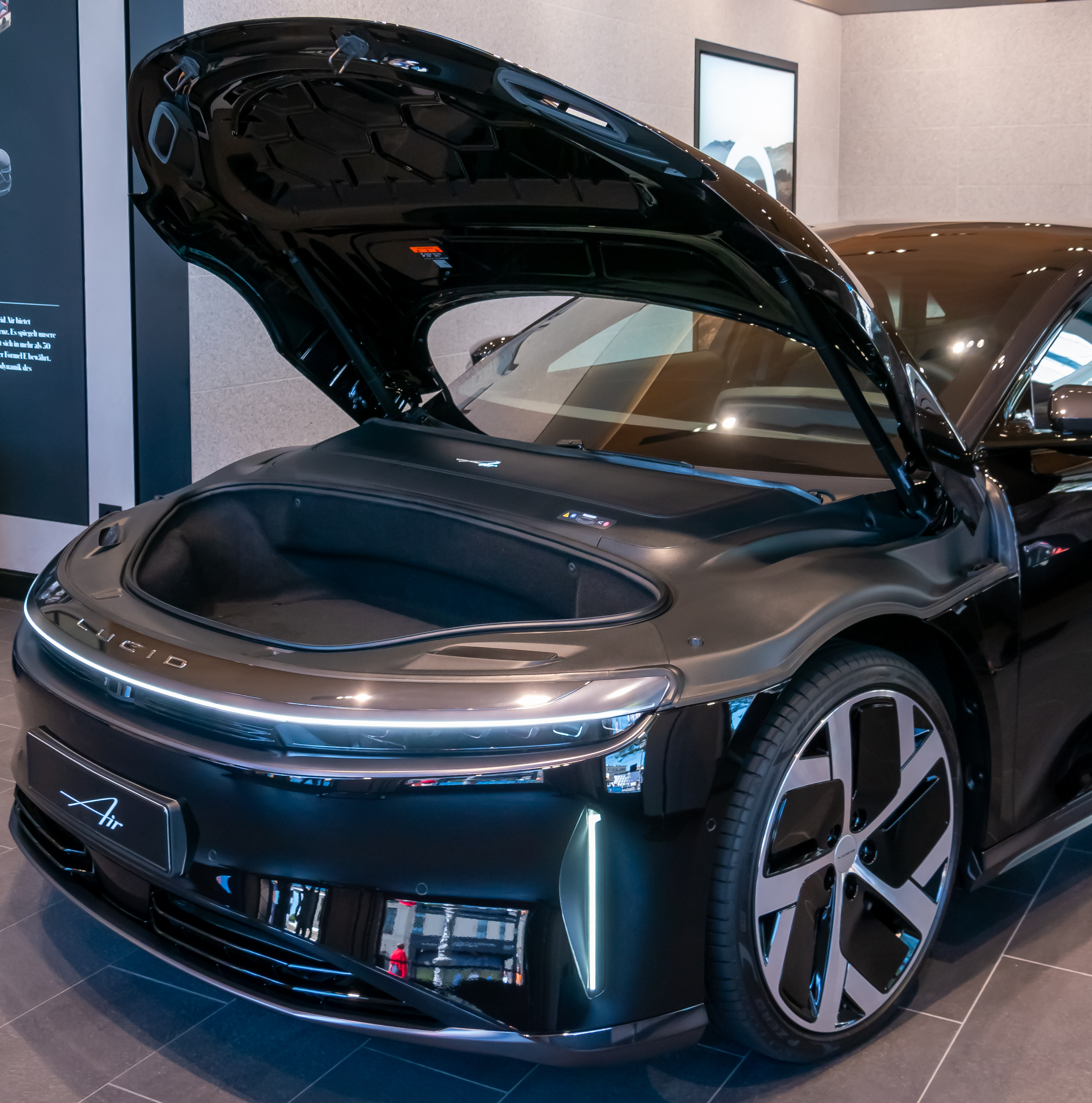
Front trunk

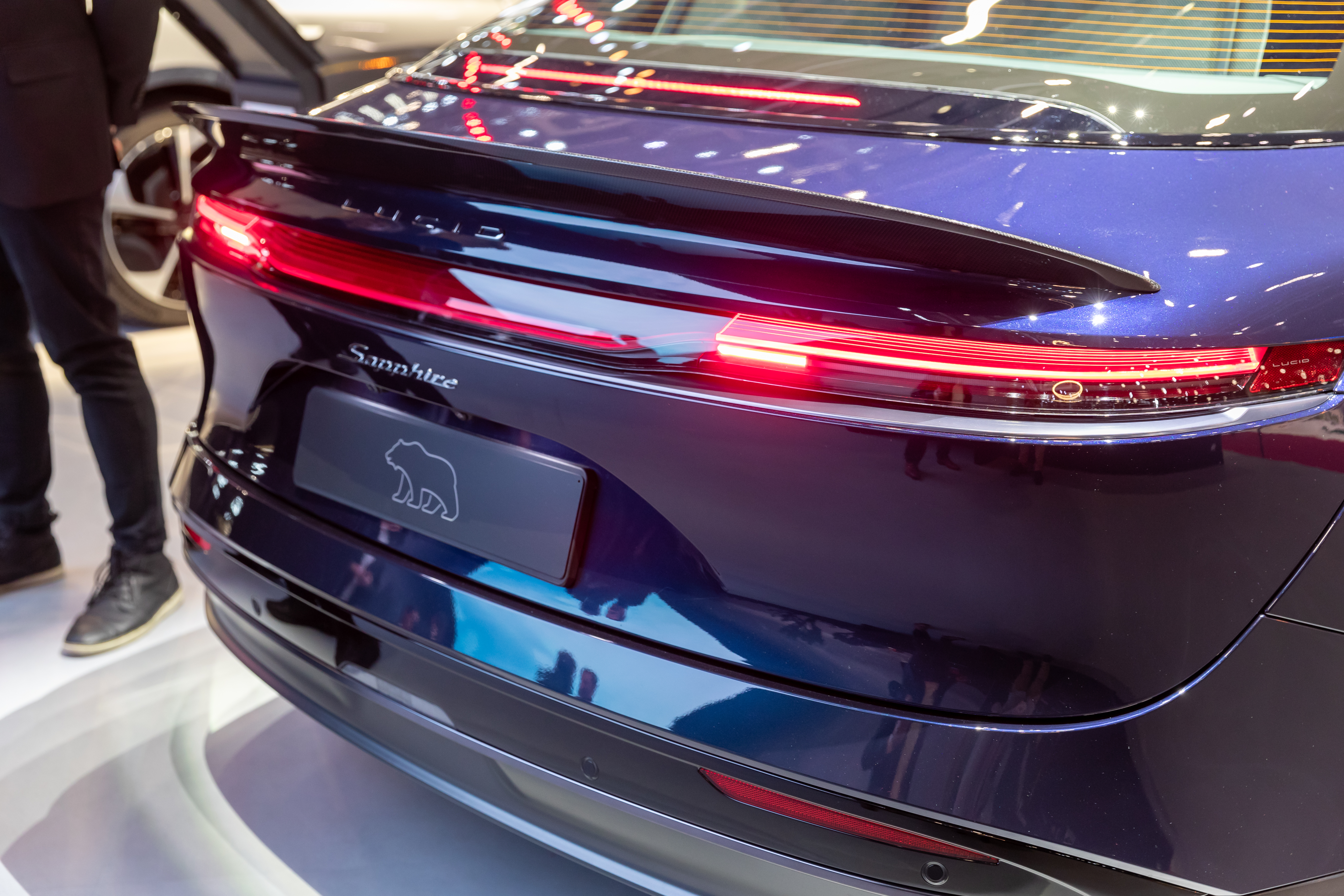
Tail spoiler on a Lucid Air Sapphire

Other standard features include "LED headlights, all the necessary hardware for autonomous driving, four high resolution screens (three of which are touch sensitive), 19-inch alloy wheels, 10-speaker sound system, 12-way power adjustment for the front seats with heating, front and rear trunk with a total luggage space of around 900 liters (32 cu ft), and over-the-air software updates."

The Air can be optioned as a dual-motor, all-wheel-drive powertrain producing up to 1,111 horsepower (828 kW) for the top of the range Air Dream Edition P.

Other options include "active suspension, a panoramic sunroof, executive rear seats that can recline up to 55 degrees, a 21-speaker sound system with noise cancellation, 20 or 21-inch alloy wheels, and 22-way electric adjustment front seats with ventilation, dynamic bolsters and massage."

== Safety ==
Euro NCAP test results Lucid Air GT (LHD) (2022)
| Test | Points | % |
|---|---|---|
| Overall: | 5 /5 stars | |
| Adult occupant: | 34.2 | 90% |
| Child occupant: | 45 | 91% |
| Pedestrian: | 42.2 | 78% |
| Safety assist: | 13.5 | 84% |

== Reception ==
The Air was chosen as one of the Top 10 Tech Cars by the IEEE in 2018 and is the 2022 Motor Trend Car of the Year. Also in 2022, the Air achieved the record for Longest Range and Fastest Charging Speed of any vehicle ever tested by Car and Driver. In April 2023 the Lucid Air was named the 2023 World Luxury Car of the Year by the World Car Awards. In April 2024, Car and Driver included the 2024 Air Sapphire in its annual Lightning Lap. It set a time of 2:44.3 around Virginia International Raceway, making it both the fastest EV ever tested and the fastest four-door ever tested around the track.

== Models ==
| Model | Pure | | Touring | Grand Touring | Grand Touring Performance | Dream Edition Range | Dream Edition Performance | Sapphire |
|---|---|---|---|---|---|---|---|---|
| Years | 2023–present (as of 2024) | 2022–present (as of 2024) | | | 2022, 2023 | 2021–2023 (Limited Edition) | | 2023–present (as of 2024) |
| Layout | Single-motor rear-wheel drive | Dual-motor all-wheel drive | | | | | | Tri-motor all-wheel drive |
| Battery capacity | 88 kWh | | 92 kWh | 112 kWh | 118 kWh | | | |
| Power | 430 hp (436 PS; 321 kW) | 480 hp (487 PS; 358 kW) | 620 hp (629 PS; 462 kW) | 819 hp (830 PS; 611 kW) | 1,050 hp (1,065 PS; 783 kW) | 933 hp (946 PS; 696 kW) | 1,111 hp (1,126 PS; 828 kW) | 1,234 hp (1,251 PS; 920 kW) |
| Torque | 550 N⋅m (406 lb⋅ft) | 600 N⋅m (443 lbf⋅ft) | 1,199 N⋅m (884 lbf⋅ft) | 1,200 N⋅m (885 lbf⋅ft) | 1,249 N⋅m (921 lbf⋅ft) | 1,390 N⋅m (1,025 lbf⋅ft) | | 1,939 N⋅m (1,430 lbf⋅ft) |
| 0 to 60 mph | 4.5 sec | 3.8 sec | 3.4 sec | 3.0 sec | 2.6 sec | 2.7 sec | 2.5 sec | 1.89 sec |
| Range (EPA) | 20-in. wheels: 394 miles (634 km); 19-in. wheels: 419 miles (674 km) | 420 miles (676 km) | 406 miles (653 km) (w. 19-in. wheels) | 21-in. wheels: 469 miles (755 km); 19-in. wheels: 512 miles (824 km) | 446 miles (718 km) | 21-in. wheels: 481 miles (774 km); 19-in. wheels: 520 miles (837 km) | 21-in. wheels: 451 miles (726 km); 19-in. wheels: 471 miles (758 km) | 427 miles (687 km) |
| DC charging | 250 kW | | | 300 kW | | | | |
| AC charging | 19.2 kW | | | | | | | |
| Curb weight | 4,564 lb (2,070 kg) | 4,988 lb (2,263 kg) | | 5,009 lb (2,272 kg) | | 5,236 lb (2,375 kg) | | 5,336 lb (2,420 kg) |
