= Lucid Motors =

American electric vehicle company

Lucid Group, Inc.

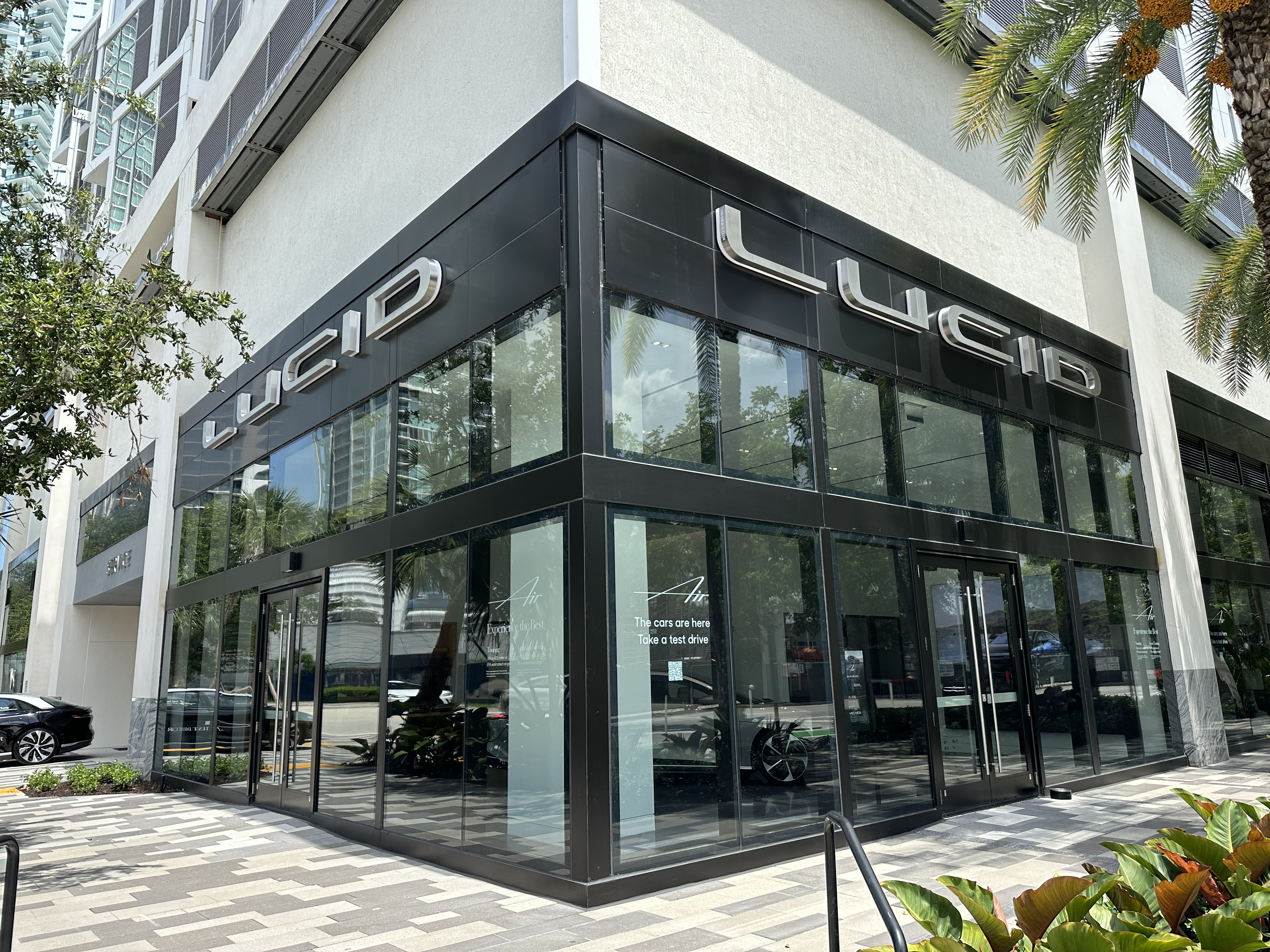
- Lucid Studio at Miami Worldcenter in 2023
- Formerly: Atieva, Inc.
- Type: Public
- Traded as: Nasdaq: LCID (Class A); Russell 1000 component
- ISIN: US5494981039
- Industry: Automotive
- Founded: 2007; 19 years ago
- Founders: Bernard Tse; Sam Weng; Sheaupyng Lin
- Headquarters: Newark, California, U.S.
- Area served: United States and Saudi Arabia
- Key people: Silvio Napoli (CEO); Marc Winterhoff (Former interim CEO); Peter Rawlinson (Former CEO/CTO)
- Production output: 17,840 (2025)
- Revenue: ▲US$1.35 billion (2025)
- Operating income: ▲ −US$3.02 billion (2024)
- Net income: ▼ −US$2.71 billion (2024)
- Total assets: ▲US$9.65 billion (2024)
- Total equity: ▼US$3.87 billion (2024)
- Number of employees: 6,800 (2024)
- Parent: Public Investment Fund (64% as of March 2025)
- Website: lucidmotors.com

Lucid Group, Inc. is an American automotive and technology company that manufactures electric vehicles and supplies advanced electric vehicle powertrain systems. The company is headquartered in Newark, California. In September 2021, the company began producing the Lucid Air sedan at its factory in Casa Grande, Arizona. Production of its second model, the Lucid Gravity SUV, started in December 2024, with customer deliveries ramping through 2025 and into 2026. Lucid also supplies and develops powertrain technology to other automakers, including Aston Martin.

Since April 2019, the majority shareholder of Lucid has been Saudi Arabia's sovereign wealth fund. Other investors include large index fund managers like Vanguard Group, BlackRock, and State Street Corporation.

== History ==
In 2007, Tesla Motors Vice President Bernard Tse, co-founder of Astoria Networks Sam Weng, and inventor Sheaupyng Lin founded a company named Atieva to build electric vehicle batteries and powertrains for vehicle manufacturers. In 2011, Atieva began working with lithium-ion cell maker Lishen to build battery packs for electric buses in China. In 2014, Beijing Automotive Industry Holding (BAIC), a state-owned carmaker, acquired a 25 percent stake in Atieva. Atieva received investments from Tsing Capital, Mitsui, Venrock, JAFCO, and others.

British engineer and businessman Peter Rawlinson, formerly Vice President of Engineering and Chief Engineer of the Model S at Tesla, Inc., joined Atieva in 2013 as Chief Technology Officer (CTO) and board member. Rawlinson and the team rebranded the company Lucid Motors in October 2016 and officially announced the company's intent to develop an all-electric, long-range, high-performance vehicle.

On November 29, 2016, Lucid executives and officials in Arizona announced the planned construction of Lucid's US$700 million manufacturing plant in Casa Grande, Arizona, which was projected to employ up to 2,000 workers by the mid-2020s, initially building 20,000 cars and expanding to 130,000 vehicles per year. Rawlinson took on the additional role of CEO in April 2019 while keeping his role as CTO and board member. The first vehicles rolled off the assembly line on September 28, 2021.

On September 17, 2018, Lucid Motors announced talks with the Public Investment Fund for $1 billion in funding. The investment was completed in April 2019. The investment would fund the final engineering, testing, and production of the Lucid Air, the first-phase construction of its manufacturing plant in Arizona, and its worldwide retail strategy, beginning in North America. Construction of the plant began in late 2019, and the first phase was completed in December 2020. The second phase of construction began in late 2021 to increase production capacity from 34,000 to 90,000 vehicles a year. The completed four phases of the factory are intended to have a combined manufacturing capacity of 400,000 cars per year.

In February 2021, Lucid Motors announced a deal valued at $11.75 billion to merge with Churchill Capital Corp IV, a publicly traded special-purpose acquisition company (SPAC). Rawlinson announced Lucid's intention to produce its Gravity SUV by 2023, then offer a competitor to Tesla's Model 3 by 2024 or 2025. On July 26, 2021, the company went public, with the Public Investment Fund owning 60 percent of Lucid. Short-term price increases recorded an unrealized gain of $20 billion from its $2.9 billion investment, for a period of time.

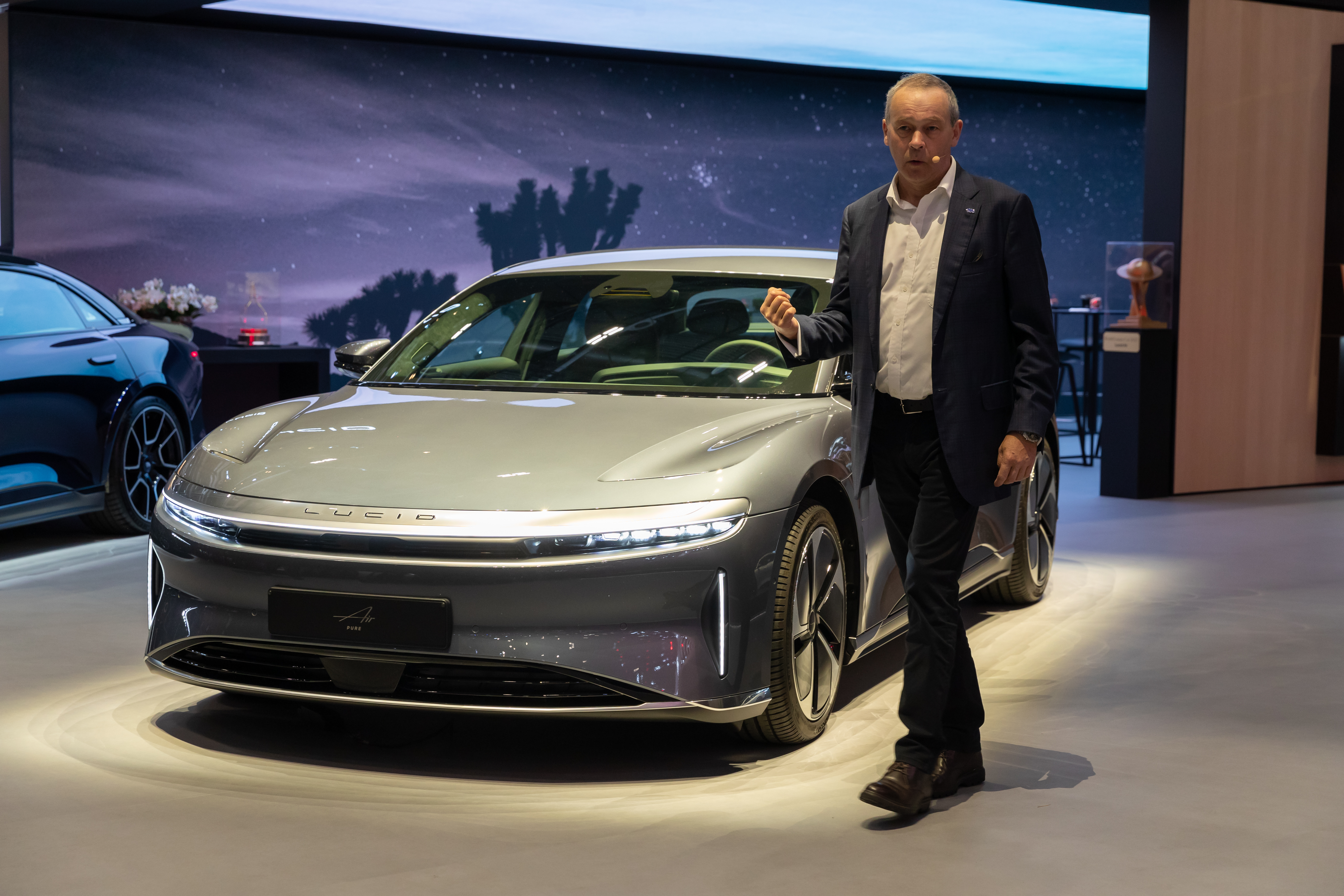
Former CEO and CTO Peter Rawlinson with the Lucid Air Pure at the Geneva International Motor Show, 2024

Lucid began building its first all-electric Lucid Air sedan in Arizona in September 2021, and deliveries began in late October. Lucid produced 7,180 vehicles in 2022, lower than expected, with the company citing supply chain issues. Lucid produced 8,428 vehicles in 2023, meeting the higher end of company guidance.

In June 2023, Lucid signed an agreement to develop and supply electric motors, powertrains, and battery systems for Aston Martin's upcoming range of fully electric cars. According to the terms of the $450 million deal, Aston Martin said it would pay Lucid $132 million in cash for its expertise; Lucid would be given a 3.7 percent stake in Aston Martin worth $100 million; and Aston Martin guaranteed it would buy at least $225 million in powertrain components.

On August 7, 2024, Lucid Group announced a further $1.5 billion in funding from its majority shareholder, Ayar Third Investment Co., an affiliate of PIF. The deal includes $750 million in convertible preferred stock and the rest in an unsecured loan.

In December 2025, Winterhoff, Lucid Motors interim CEO, announced that the company is on track to produce around 18,000 EVs in 2025. This is in line with the low end of its forecast range.

On April 14, 2026, it was announced that Silvio Napoli, chairman and CEO of Schindler Group, would become Lucid's next permanent CEO.

In July 2026, it was announced that Alexander De Bock, previously CFO of TI Automotive, will join as CFO.

== Leadership ==
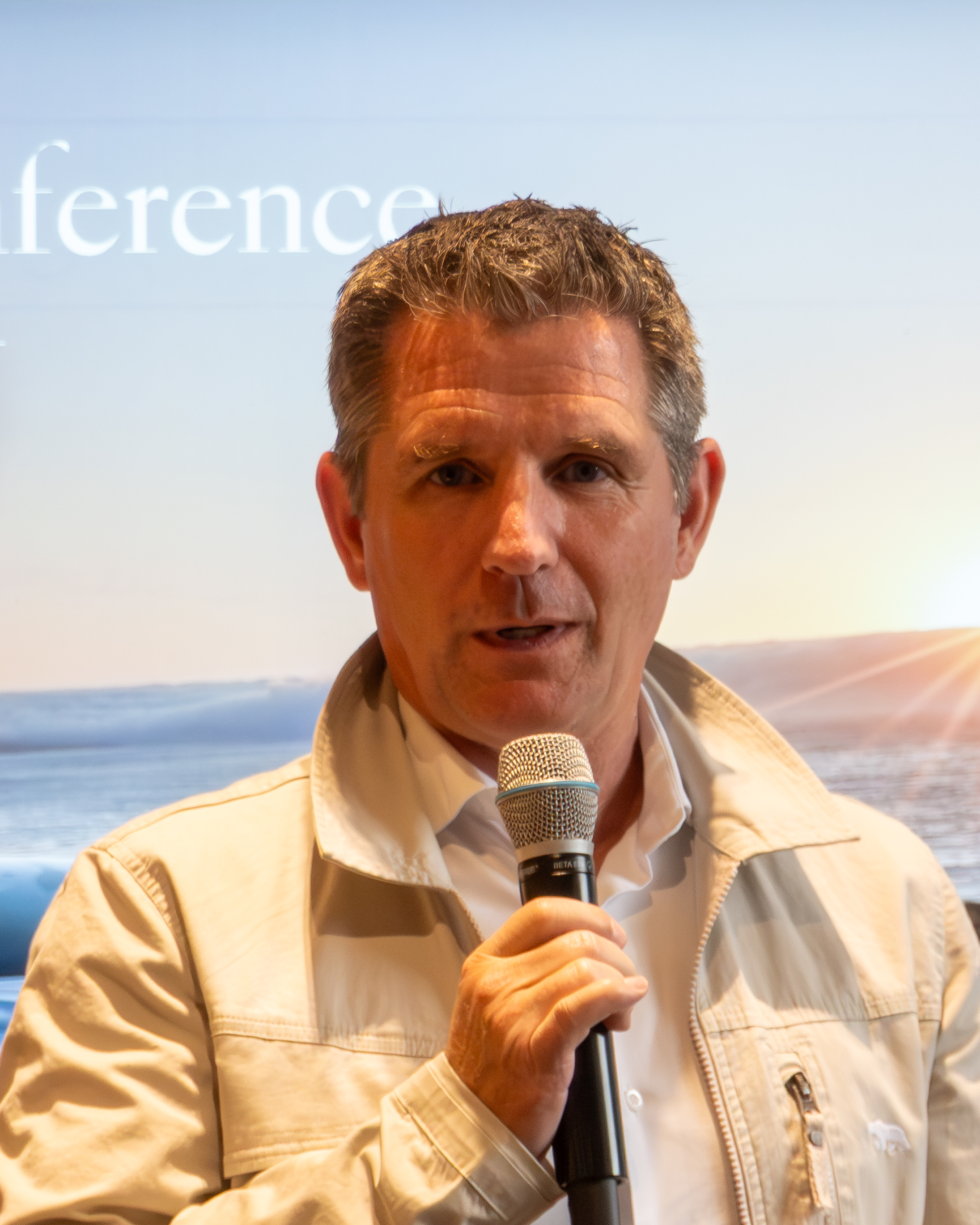
Former CEO Marc Winterhoff

- Bernard Tse (2007–2019)
- Peter Rawlinson (2019–2025)
- Marc Winterhoff (2025–2026)
- Silvio Napoli (2026–present)

== Vehicles ==
Lucid mainly developed battery technology in its early years, but began development of its first car in 2014.

The company initially used a Mercedes Metris van named "Edna" to develop the powertrain.

=== Lucid Air ===
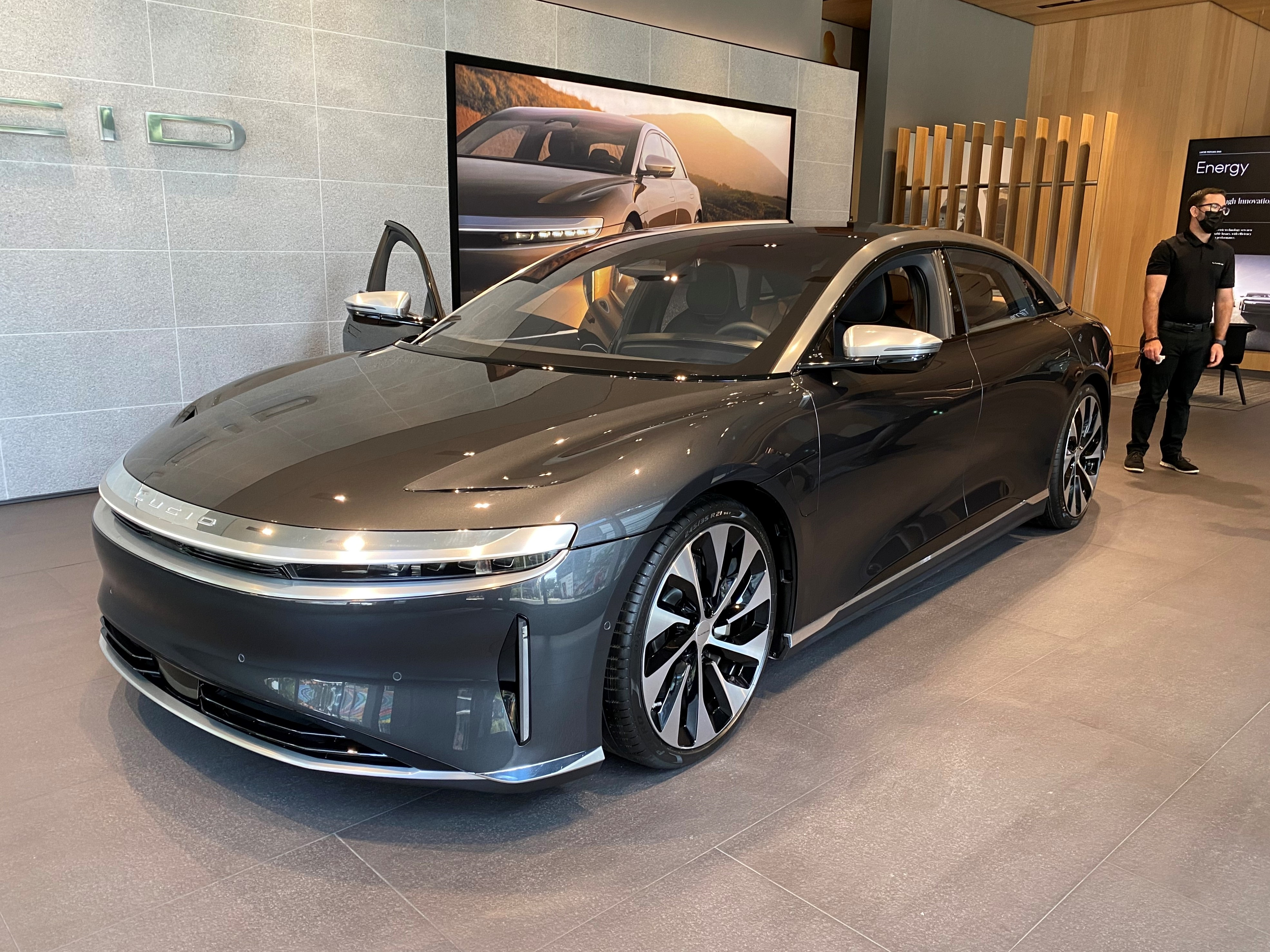
Lucid Air

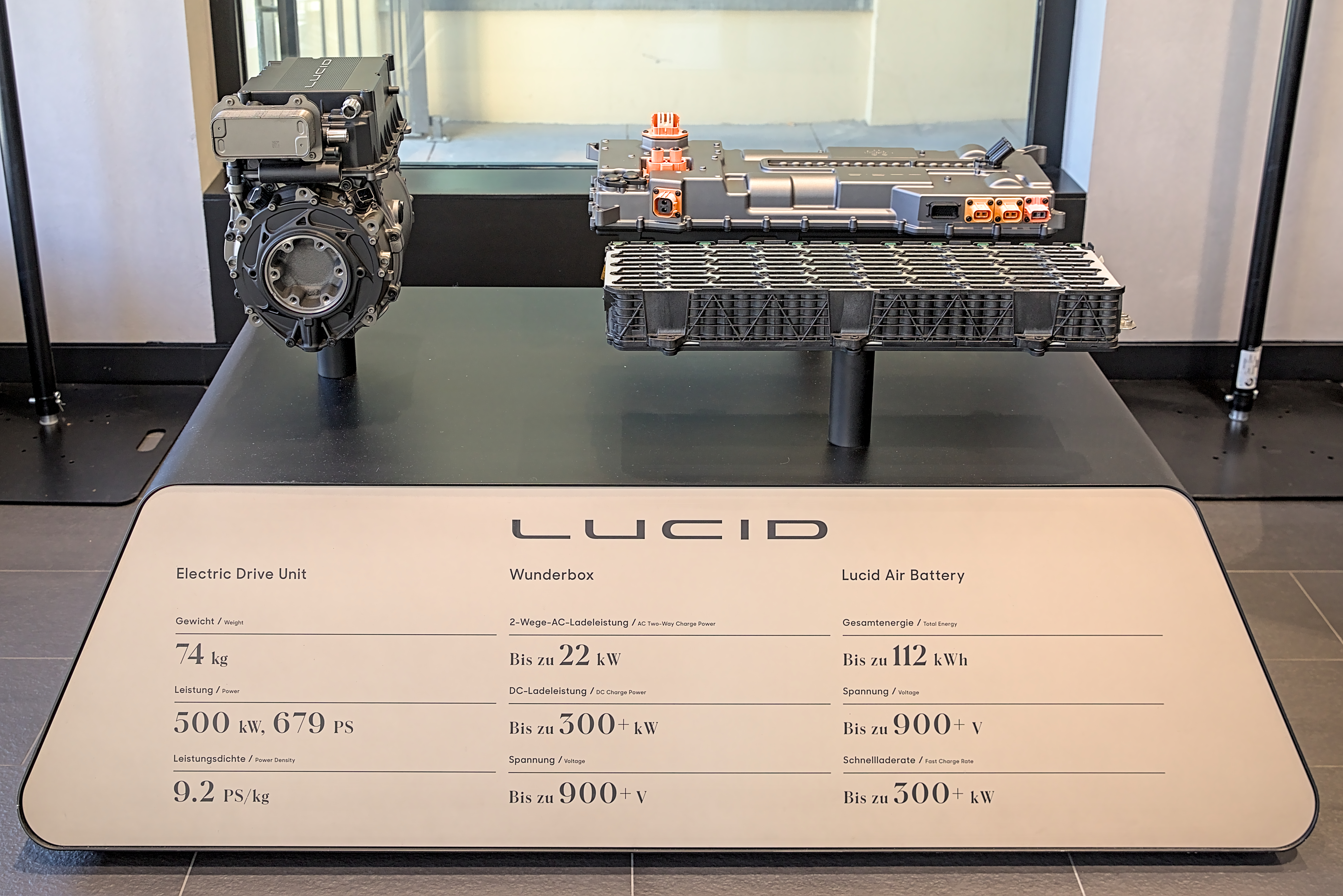
Electric Drive Unit and the Lucid Air Battery

A prototype of the Lucid Air fully electric car was unveiled in December 2016. Lucid Air production was expected to start in spring 2021. In November 2020, The Lucid Air Pure was announced with 406 mi (653 km) of projected range and 480 hp (360 kW) and a starting price of US$77,400. The full range of models includes Lucid Air Touring, Grand Touring, and Dream Edition versions. The top-spec cars have an output of over 1,000 hp (750 kW).

On September 16, 2020, the US Environmental Protection Agency (EPA) rated the range of the Lucid Air at 520 miles (840 km) on a single charge.

Lucid has agreed with Mobileye to use their EyeQ4 chips and eight cameras for driver assist features, and will make the car "autonomous ready". The 4-door sedan is able to reach a software-limited top speed of 217 mph (349 km/h). In July 2017, while running on the high-speed track at the Transportation Research Center in Ohio a special version of the car (with the speed limiter disabled via software and other modifications) hit 235 mph (378 km/h).

Lucid is collaborating with Amazon to include Amazon's Alexa voice assistant, allowing drivers to use the voice assistant for navigation, phone calls, media streaming, smart home control, and other activities while driving.

The infotainment system is based on Android Automotive.

The character of Samantha Margolis uses a Lucid Air in several episodes of season four of the Amazon Studios TV series Goliath.

In September 2021, Lucid released the EPA estimated range for both the Dream Edition Air and Air Grand Touring; the Dream Air had a range of 520 miles on a single charge while the Grand Touring offered 516 miles, making the Dream the most extended range of any EV rated by the EPA and the Grand Touring the first to top 400 miles in a test drive.

Lucid Motors unveiled its 2022 Lucid Air Grand Touring model in November 2021. This version of the Air Grand Touring is powered by two electric motors that have a combined 819 hp (611 kW) and 885 lb⋅ft (1,200 N⋅m) of torque.

On May 5, 2022, Lucid announced that it was raising prices of the variants of its luxury Air sedan beginning June 1, 2022. The price hikes were expected to push the base price of the Air sedan up as much as 13%.

Lucid Air was named Motor Trend's 2022 Car of the Year, being the first time a brand new car model won the award.

In April 2023, the company began delivering a blacked-out or dark-trimmed 'Stealth' Air to customers following its introduction in August. Also in April 2023, Lucid Air won the 2023 World Luxury Car of the Year award.

=== Lucid Gravity ===
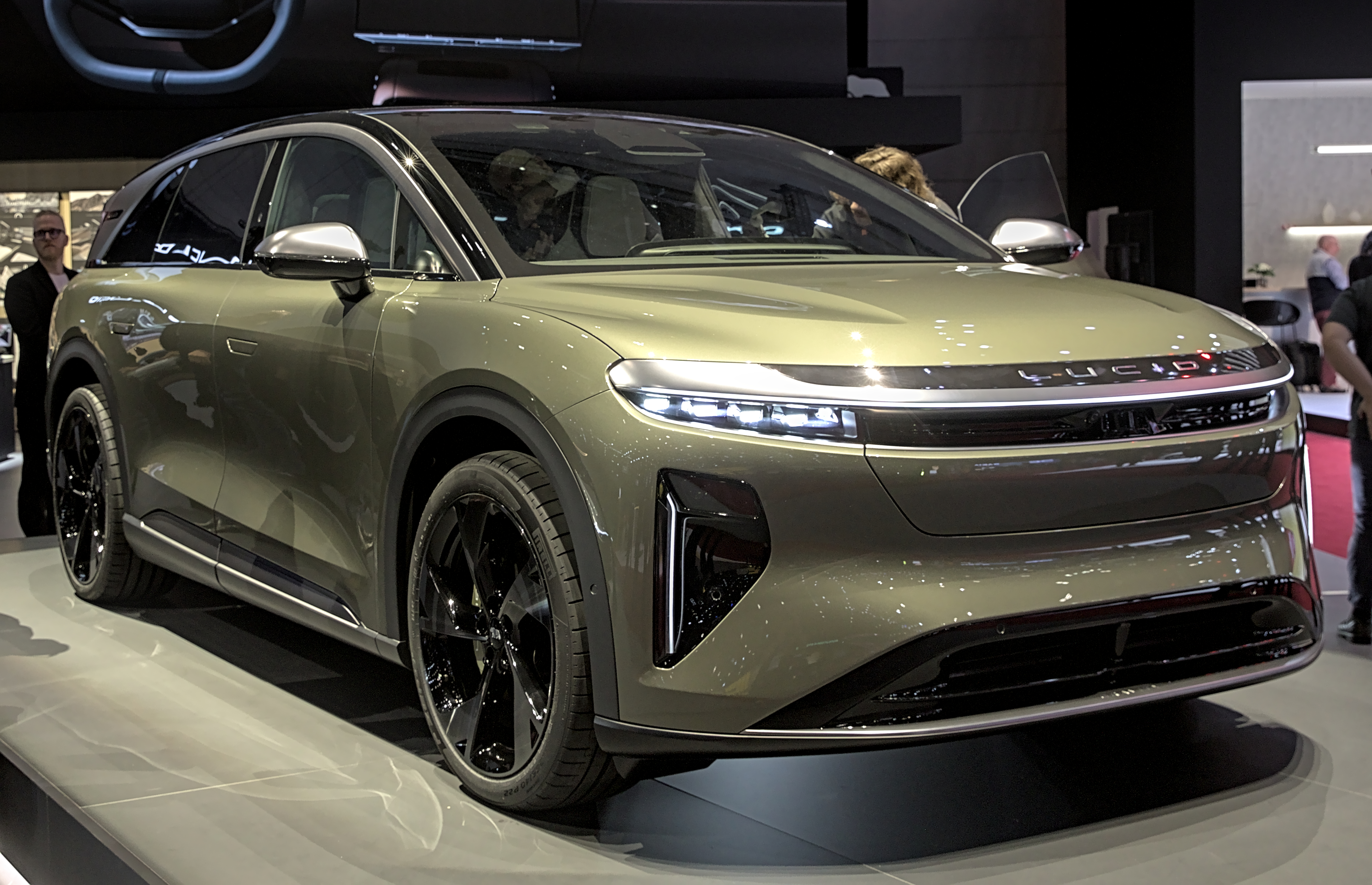
Lucid Gravity

Lucid teased an electric SUV concept in September 2020 called Project Gravity with only a brief image and short video segment. Additional details were found in the patents that Lucid filed for the Gravity. The patents show that the Gravity features sleek headlamps similar to the Lucid Air, a visibly short hood, and a large windscreen. In addition, the patents show that the side of the vehicle has a horizontal beltline and sleek, expansive windows and quarter glass panels.

The company said that Lucid will use Panasonic batteries in its long-range Lucid Air and its Gravity SUV, which begin production in 2024.

On November 16, 2023, the vehicle was officially unveiled at the 2023 Los Angeles Auto Show, with an anticipated delivery date of late 2024 for the 2025 model year. The SUV will feature a 440-mile range via a dual-motor electric powertrain and a 0–60 time of 3.5 seconds, with a starting price of under $80,000.

In December 2023, electric vehicle charging startup Gravity Inc. filed a "petition for cancellation" with the U.S. Patent and Trademark Office over Lucid's use of the word "gravity". In June 2024, Gravity Inc. and Lucid came to a settlement allowing Lucid the use of the name "gravity."

Lucid opened orders for the Gravity on November 7, 2024, with the first production unit completing production at Lucid's Casa Grande factory on December 5, 2024. Lucid also does final assembly of the Gravity with parts shipped from the Casa Grande factory at the Lucid plant in the KAEC in Saudi Arabia, for the Saudi market.

On January 6, 2025, Lucid Motors announced that Gravity would use Panasonic Energy's Latest-Generation High-Performance EV batteries. The Lucid Gravity Grand Touring offers 828 horsepower, can accelerate from 0 to 60 miles per hour (97 km/h) in under 3.5 seconds, and has an EPA-rated range of up to 450 miles (720 km).

=== Upcoming midsize SUVs ===
On an earnings call in May 2024, Lucid CEO Peter Rawlinson announced that the company will build a new midsize SUV at its facility in Saudi Arabia, with a target production start in late 2026 and a starting price of about $48,000. At an investor presentation in September 2024, Lucid Motors shared a teaser image of this SUV.

At an Investor Day event on March 12, 2026, Lucid announced three new midsize models: the Cosmos, which focuses on efficiency, space, and performance; the Earth, with an intermediate level of off-road capability; and an unnamed third model, which the company said was intended to deliver a "suburban, any-road, adventure-focused" driving experience. The company later delayed volume production of the midsize platform (including Cosmos) until the second half of 2027.

=== Robotaxis ===
On July 18, 2025, Uber Technologies, Nuro, and Lucid Motors announced a partnership to offer at least 20,000 Lucid Gravity cars modified with Nuro autonomous technology as level 4 self-driving cars on Uber's platform. They planned the launch for 2026. Lucid will receive $300 million from Uber for this. In 2026 the commitment was expanded to at least 35,000 vehicles, with early testing underway in the San Francisco Bay Area and Houston.

In 2026, at an Investor Day event, Lucid introduced the Lunar, a concept car with two seats, proposed for use as a robotaxi. The Lunar is built on a shortened version of the midsize platform for the Cosmos, the Earth, and an unnamed third SUV that was announced at the same event.

== Batteries ==
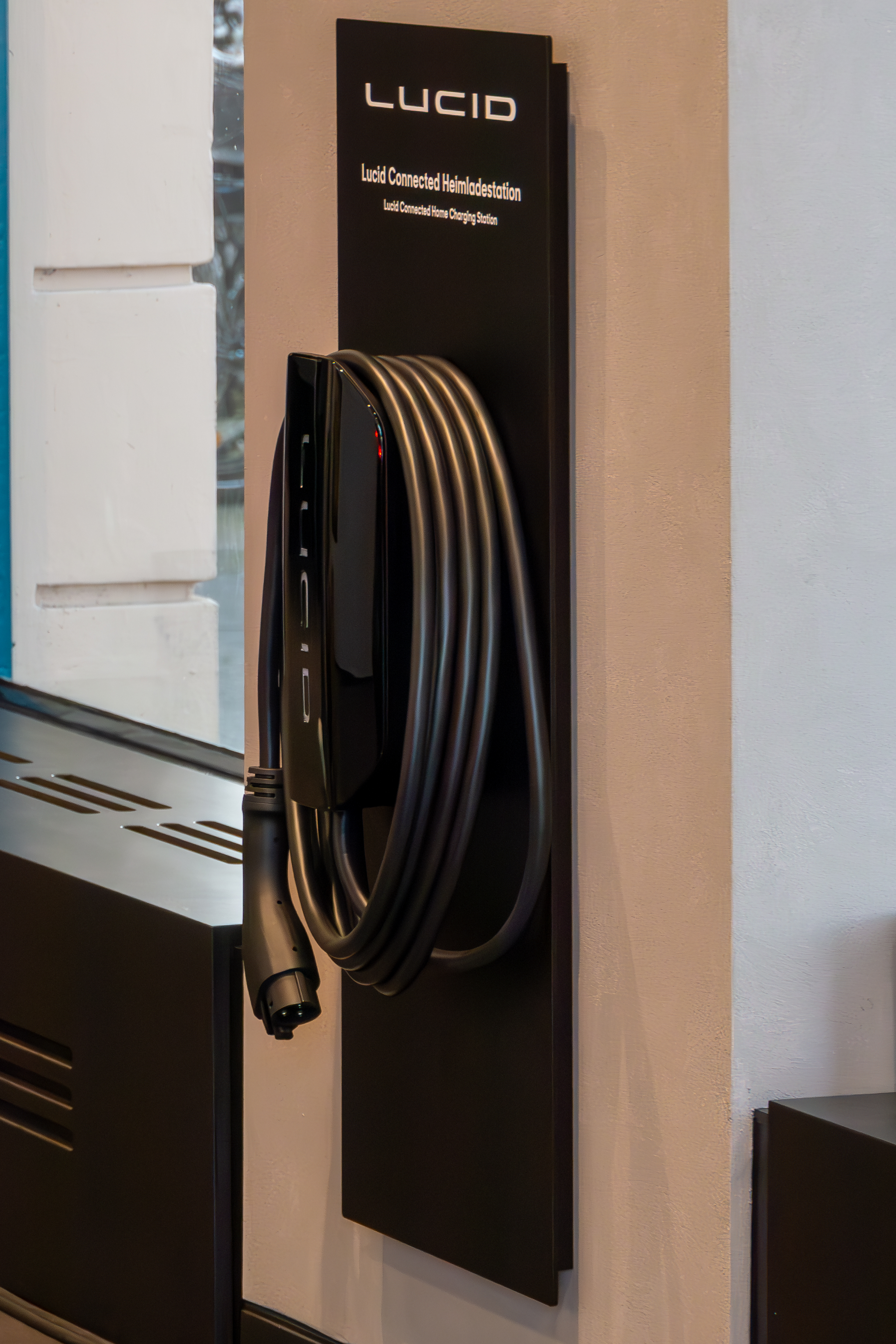
Lucid Connected Home Charging Station is a dedicated home charger solution provided by Lucid.

The Lucid Air was planned as of 2020 to debut with a 900V+ electrical architecture and custom lithium-ion battery cells. It was planned to use the 2170 standard for the cells, and, by 2019, supply agreements were signed with both Samsung SDI and LG Chem.

In February 2020, Lucid Motors announced a partnership with LG Chem through which the latter company would provide battery cells for the Lucid Air sedan through 2023.

On December 13, 2022 – Panasonic Energy Co., Ltd., and Lucid Group, Inc. announced they have entered into multi-year agreements to supply batteries for Lucid's vehicles.

Lucid supplied battery packs for the Gen2 Formula E race cars from the 2018–2019 season through the 2021–2022 season, in collaboration with McLaren Applied Technologies and Sony. The Formula E specification called for a battery weight of 250 kg (550 lb), 54 kWh energy, and peak power of up to 250 kW.

=== Charging ===
Lucid Motors partnered with Electrify America (EA) in 2019 to use their nationwide charging network as an option for recharging Lucid's electric vehicles on the road. The Lucid Air is able to add up to 300 miles (480 km) in 20 minutes (or 200 miles in 12 minutes) when using the station's 350 kW charging capability, where that capability is available in EA charging stations.

In 2022, Lucid announced their own home charging solution called the Lucid Connected Home Charging Station which would add 80 miles to the battery in just an hour. After most auto manufacturers serving the North American market adopted the North American Charging System (NACS), in late 2023 Lucid also announced plans to equip their vehicles with the NACS ports in 2025. Lucid announced in 2025 that starting January 31, 2025, they will deliver the Gravity SUV with a NACS port, but that the Air sedan will still require an adapter when it gains access to the Supercharger network in the second quarter of 2025.

The Lucid Air's RangeXchange feature also enables the Air to charge other electric vehicles directly using Lucid's RangeXchange charging adapter.

On July 8, 2025, the company announced that it had set a Guinness World Record with a range of 1,205 kilometres (749 mi) on a single charge with the Lucid Air Grand Touring'.

== Manufacturing facilities ==
In December 2019, Lucid broke ground on a factory in Casa Grande, Arizona On December 1, 2020, Lucid completed factory construction, dubbed AMP-1, and "aims to ramp up to 400,000 electric cars per year."

The US$700 million facility was expected to begin producing the Lucid Air by spring 2021. The initial phase includes an initial 999,000 square feet (92,800 m^{2}). Phase 2 of construction was expected to begin in early 2021. The land upon which this facility is built is owned by Pinal County, Arizona, which leases the 500-acre (200 ha) plot to Lucid. The land was bought by Pinal County for $29.94 million; it was financed by issuing bonds.

On February 28, 2022, Lucid announced a long-term plan to build a new manufacturing plant in Saudi Arabia that will produce 150,000 vehicles per year. Lucid has partnered with the Ministry of Investment of Saudi Arabia (MISA), The Saudi Industrial Development Fund (SIDF), and the King Abdullah Economic City (KAEC).

== Saudi Arabia investment ==
The Saudi Arabian government announced on April 27, 2022, that it plans to buy at least 50,000 and possibly up to 100,000 electric vehicles from Lucid Motors over a decade. The purchase is part of the government's effort to reduce its reliance on oil. The government selected Lucid Motors because it is building its first international manufacturing plant in Saudi Arabia to produce 150,000 cars annually.

== Ownership ==
The 10 largest institutional shareholders of Lucid as of September 30, 2024 were:

Shareholder name	Percentage
Public Investment Fund	45.65%
The Vanguard Group	2.79%
BlackRock	1.43%
State Street	0.55%
Morgan Stanley	0.52%
Geode Capital Management	0.51%
Mirae Asset Global ETFs Holdings	0.32%
D.E. Shaw	0.32%
First Trust Advisors	0.22%
Charles Schwab Investment Management	0.17%
Others	47.52%

== See also ==
- List of automobile manufacturers of the United States
- List of production battery electric vehicles
- Plug-in electric vehicles in the United States
