= Chevrolet Step-Van =

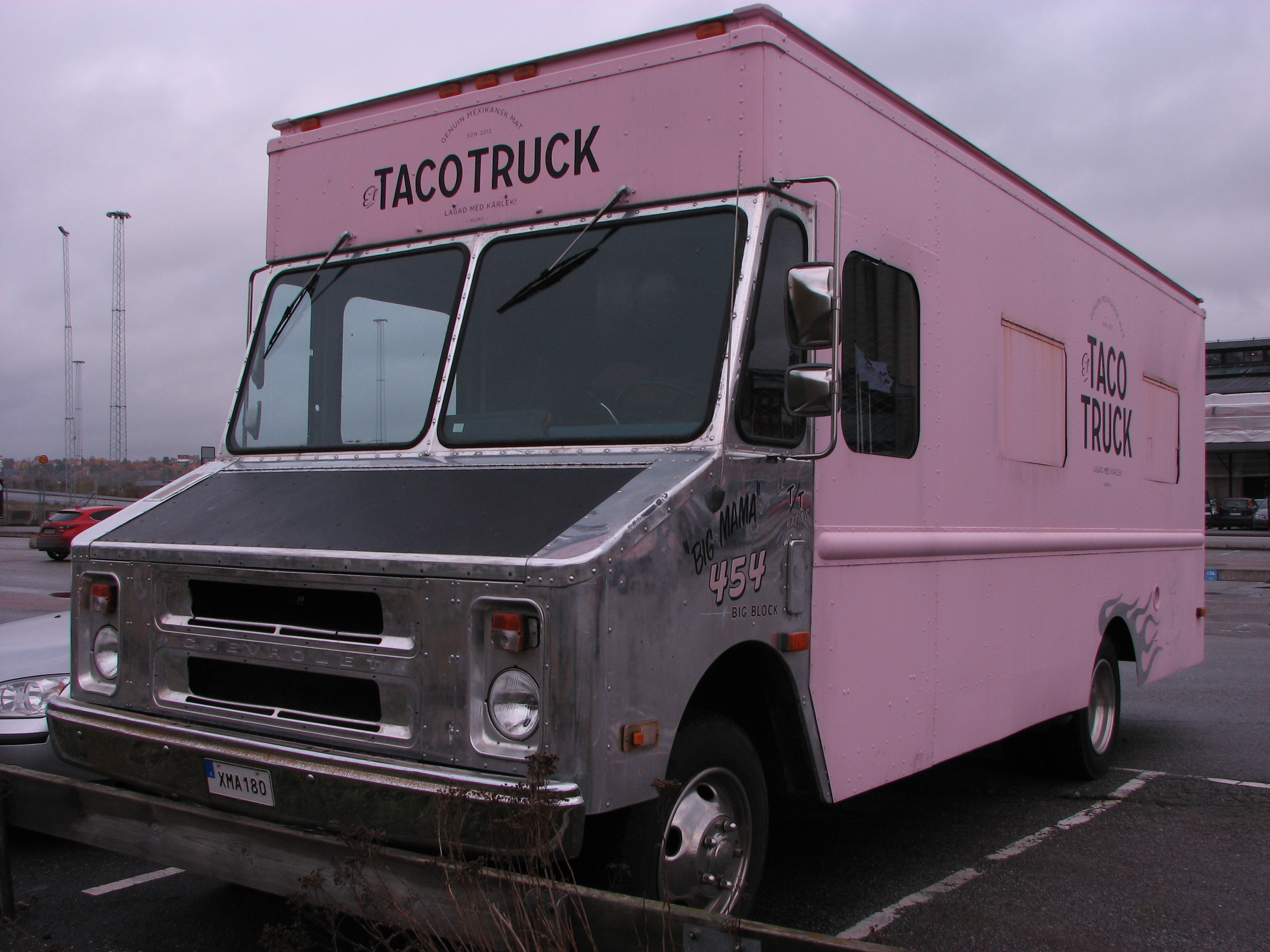

Overview
- Manufacturer: Body: Union City Body Company, Union City, Indiana; Chevrolet (General Motors)
- Also called: GMC Value-Van; Chevrolet Forward-Control Chassis
- Production: 1940–1942, 1946–1998
- Assembly: Detroit Assembly (purchased by Workhorse Custom Chassis in 1998)

Body and chassis
- Class: Multi-stop truck
- Body style: 2-door van
- Platform: General Motors P-series
- Related: Chevrolet C/K

Chronology
- Successor: Workhorse P-series

The Chevrolet Step-Van (and its badge-engineered counterpart, the GMC Value-Van) is a multi-stop truck made by General Motors from 1940 to 1998.

== Dubl-Duti ==
The first generation of General Motors multi-stop delivery van was called the Dubl-Duti, introduced in 1940. The van was built on the 115-inch (2,921 mm) chassis of the Chevrolet pickup truck, with a body built by Divco Twin. The Dubl-Duti van used the same 216.5-cubic-inch (3.5 L) "Thriftmaster" six-cylinder engine as the pickup and Chevrolet passenger cars, but with a single-barrel updraft Carter carburetor rather than the downdraft Rochester unit used in other Chevrolet trucks.

The Dubl-Duti was restyled in 1941 to suit the new Chevrolet AK Series truck body. Despite the "Advance Design" trucks being released in calendar year 1947 as a 1948 model, the AK Series-based Dubl-Duti continued production for another year thereafter.

A new generation of Dubl-Duti was introduced for model year 1949, with two different wheelbases shared with the medium-duty Advance Design pickup trucks: the model 3742 with 125 1/4-inch (3,181 mm) wheelbase, and 137-inch (3,480 mm) log model 3942 . The "Thriftmaster" engine was carried over for the 1949 and 1950 model years, and replaced for 1951 by the 235.5-cubic-inch (3.9 L) "Loadmaster" engine. The Dubl-Duti ceased production in 1955.

== Step-Van ==
In 1955, a new series of Chevrolet forward-control chassis launched, similar to the previous Dubl-Duti, available in three sizes:

- the model 3442, with a 104 in (2,642 mm) wheelbase able to accommodate a body length up to 8 ft (2.4 m),
- the 3542, with a 125 in (3,175 mm) wheelbase able to accommodate a 10 ft (3.0 m) body, and
- the 3742, with a 137 in (3,480 mm) wheelbase able to accommodate a 12 ft (3.7 m) body.

All models were available only with the "Loadmaster" six-cylinder engine, which was renamed the "Thriftmaster Special" in 1956. The "Special" moniker was used to distinguish the fact that it still had a downdraft carburetor (as the Dubl-Duti vans before it had) and a positive crankcase ventilation system to prevent combustion gases from passing up into the cabin while the truck was slow-moving or stationary. (Most cars at the time relied on a draft tube to passively vent the crankcase gases to atmosphere when the vehicle was in motion, which was not feasible for the enclosed engine bay and anticipated use of the forward-control chassis for delivery vans.) The 265-cubic-inch (4.3 L) Trademaster V8 engine was available as an option in 1956 and 1957.

The standard transmission was a column-shifted three-speed, but a floor-shifted four-speed was added as an option in 1951, and heavier-duty Borg-Warner three-speed and the Hydramatic automatic transmission were also available as options beginning in 1954.

Until 1958, GM only made the rolling forward-control chassis for other coachbuilders such as Boyertown, De Kalb, Dayton T. Brown, Olson, Alf-Herman, Universal, and Montpelier to fit specialized van bodies to. Beginning in 1958, GM began selling its own steel bodies on its forward-control chassis, and called the new vans Step-Van. The bodies were installed by the Union City Body Company, a GM subsidiary based in Union City, Indiana.

The Thriftmaster Special six-cylinder engine was discontinued in 1962 and replaced by the 230-cubic-inch (3.8 L) High Torque 230 engine. The 292-cubic-inch (4.8 L) High Torque 292 was available as an option in P20 and P30 beginning in 1964, and the 250-cubic-inch (4.1 L) High Torque 250 became standard in the P20 and P30 in 1966, replacing the 230. The two-stroke, 159-cubic-inch (2.6 L) Detroit Diesel 3-53N three-cylinder engine was available in 1967; it produced peak power of 82 hp (61 kW) at 2,500 rpm and 193 lb⋅ft (262 N⋅m) of torque at 1,500 rpm.

The first generation Step-Vans became known as the "round-front" after the "square-front" Step-Van King was introduced in 1964. Production of the older body (model codes P2545, P2645, P3545, and P3645) ceased in 1967.

== Step-Van 7 ==
A new shortened model called the "Step-Van 7"—also known by the P10-series chassis code—was introduced in 1961, so named for its 7-foot (2.1 m) body on a new 102-inch (2,591 mm) wheelbase. It is notable for its usage as ice cream vans, primarily in the US.

== Step-Van King ==
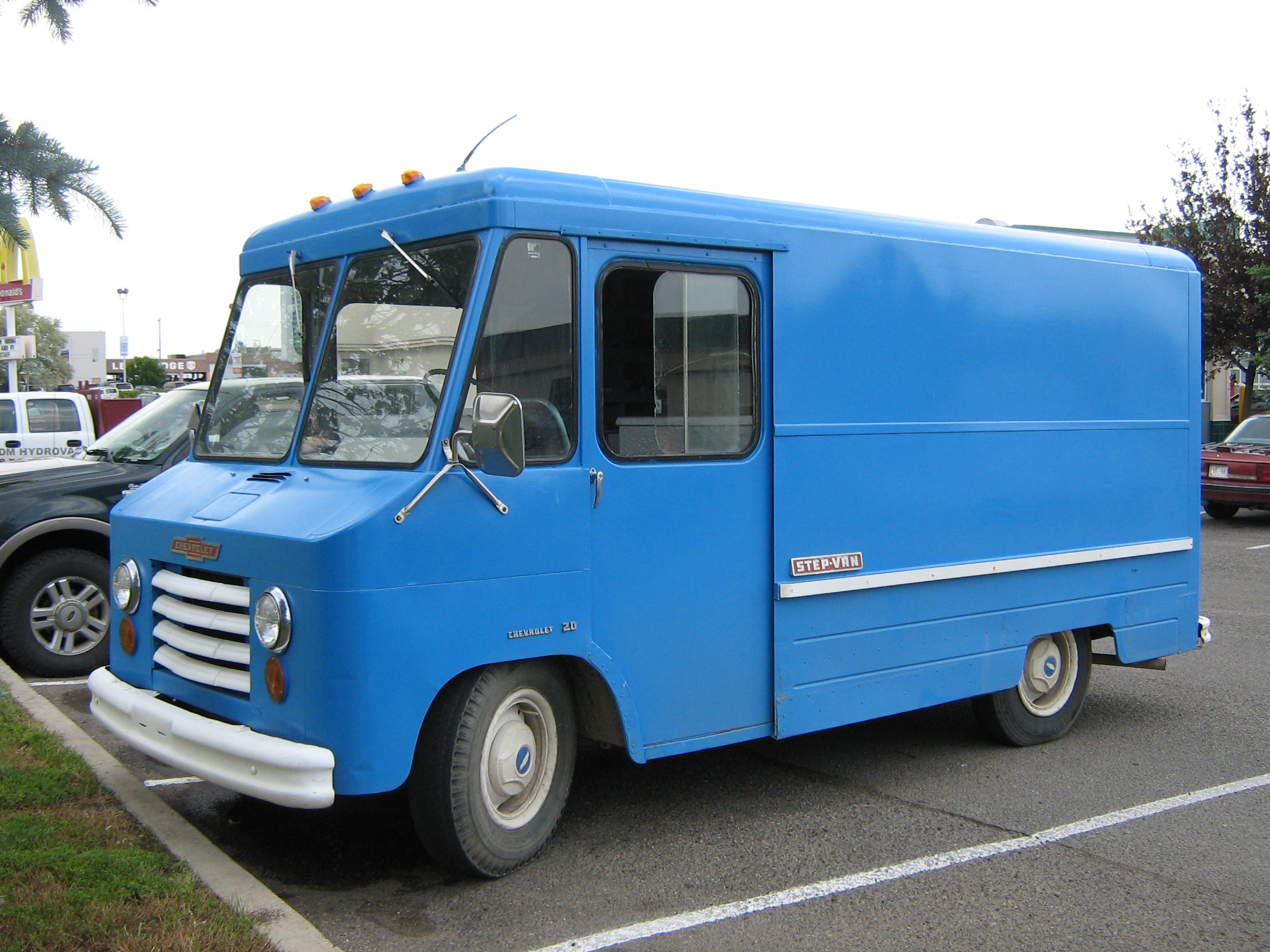
1964–1967 20-series Step-Van King

A new series of models with squared-off styling (P2535 and P3535) reminiscent of the Step-Van 7 was introduced in 1964.

The Step-Van King, referred to simply as the Step-Van after the Step-Van 7 ceased production in 1981, remained in production with a choice of either steel or aluminum bodywork until GM sold the Union City plant in 1998.
