= Multi-stop truck =

Truck used for local deliveries

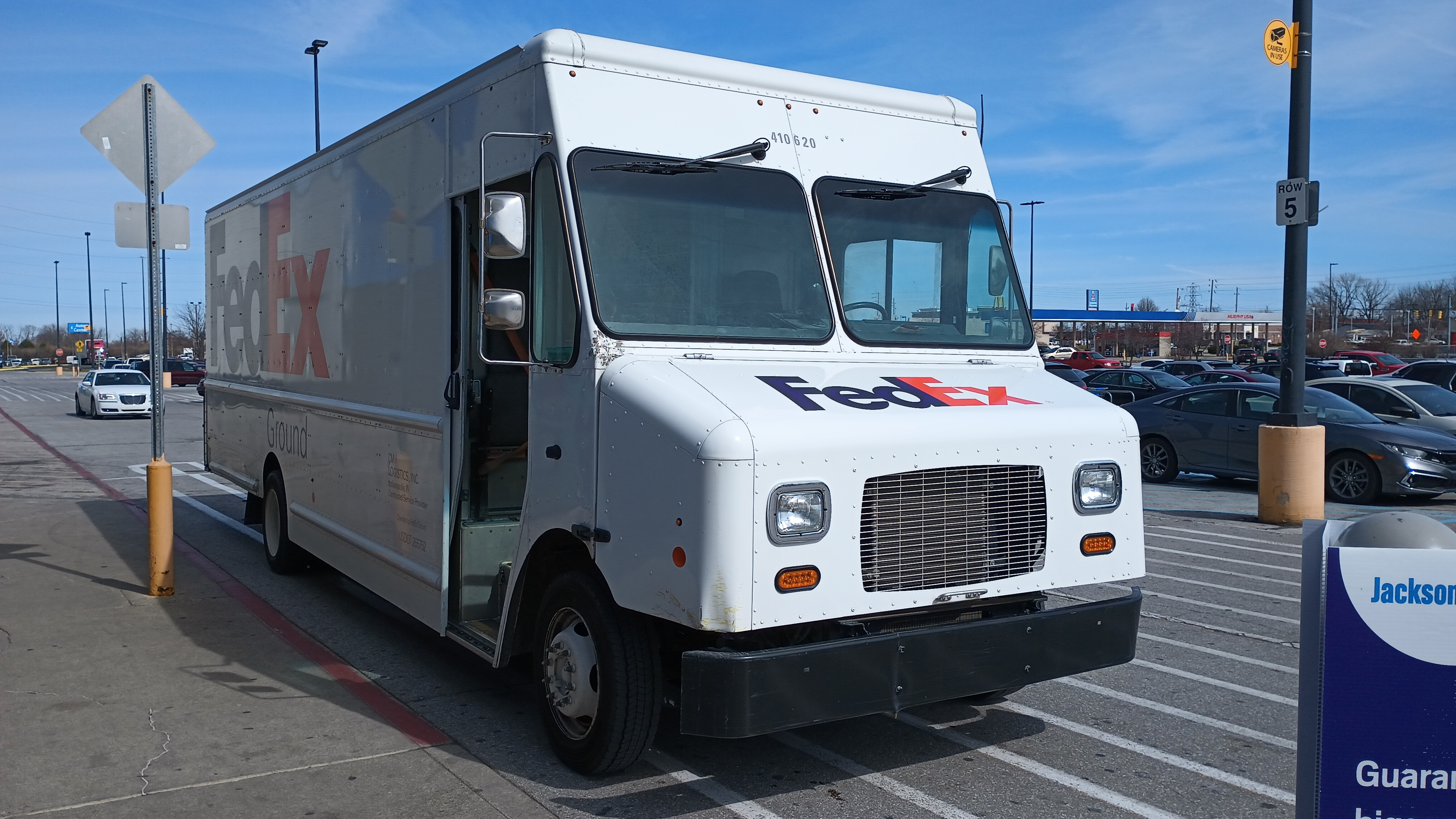
A multi-stop truck operated by FedEx Ground

A multi-stop truck (also known as a step van, walk-in van, walk-thru van, delivery van, or bread truck; "truck" and "van" are interchangeable in some dialects) is a type of commercial vehicle designed to make multiple deliveries or stops, with easy access to the transported cargo held in the rear. They first appeared in the United States in the 1920s. They are usually vans or trucks designed to be used as fleet vehicles by businesses within local areas.

Former and current manufacturers of multi-stop trucks include Morgan Olson, Utilimaster, Workhorse Group, Freightliner Trucks, International Motors, Ford, General Motors, International Harvester, Flxible, Pak-Age-Car, Gerstenslager and Divco.

== History and usage ==
The first walk-in truck is generally considered to be the Pak-Age-Car, which first appeared in 1925 and entered production in 1926. The concept had been developed by two men named Oldfield and Rollston, both of Chicago, with the intent of providing a direct replacement for the horse. The Divco entered production a little later the same year. The first iterations were low-powered vehicles, designed to replace the horse in last-mile deliveries, and were often marketed as "mechanical horses" and the like; White's offering was even called the White Horse. They are designed for frequent stops with ease of access being a priority; load floors are low and the driver can exit on either side. Early versions were often designed for the driver to be standing up.

They typically use commercial truck chassis with a generally larger, taller body and sometimes also a longer or shorter wheelbase. Though they have traditionally been powered by internal combustion engines, into the 21st century many multi-stop trucks have begun shifting to electric truck platforms. Multi-stop trucks are primarily used as cargo delivery vehicles, but are also popularly used as general utility vehicles, mail trucks, moving vans, aerial work platforms, food trucks, ice cream vans, milk floats, canteens, or bookmobiles. One common historical use for them was delivering bread, hence its nickname of "bread truck". Outside businesses, they are also sometimes used as mobile command centers, police vans, and SWAT vehicles by emergency services.

Multi-stop trucks are commonly seen in North America; in other regions such as Europe and Asia, their task is often undertaken by panel vans, light commercial vehicles, and box trucks. Nonetheless, there have been European walk-in trucks, with Commer's "Walk-Thru" truck being the most successful. This was later sold with Dodge badging. Many other vans, like Citroën's HY, have a flat floor and allow the operator to enter and exit on either side or to the cargo area.

The bodystyle has also had a long-term presence in Japan, with the first model being the 1952 Toyopet Route Van, a cab-over version based on the Toyopet Model SB, with bodywork by outside specialists Shin-Nikkoku Kogyo. In 1968, Isuzu released an aluminum-bodied walk-through van model of the recently renewed Elf, called the Elf High Roof. In 1982, Yamato Transport and Toyota jointly developed the Quick Delivery for home delivery duties. In 1984 the Daihatsu Mira Walk-Through Van was released, fitted with a panel van body with folding doors and a single seat but retaining the original passenger car's bonnet. This eye-catching vehicle is likely the smallest step-thru van, and several other companies like Mitsubishi and Suzuki followed suit. The Mira continued to be produced into the 1990s, but it too was discontinued when the kei car standards were revised in 1998.

The Toyota Quick Delivery ended production in 2016 (having been only built for Yamato Transport since 2011); there were no step-thru vans built in Japan until the Hino Dutro Z EV went on sale in 2022.

== Manufacturers ==
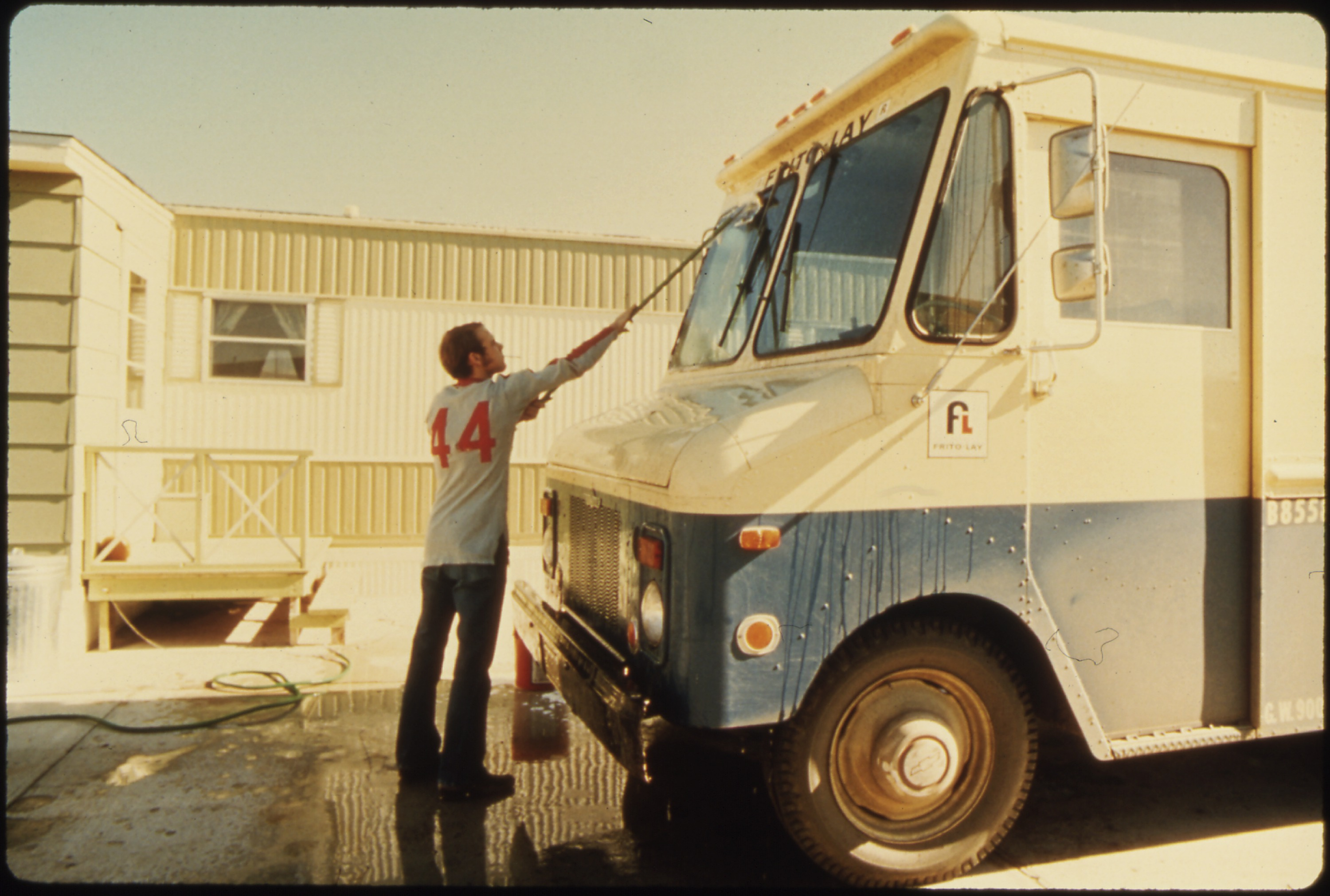
A Frito-Lay truck driver washing his Grumman Olson Kurbmaster in New Ulm, Minnesota in 1974

- Chevrolet Step-Van and its twin GMC Value Van or others were successors to the shared "Dubl-Duti" delivery vans, produced by General Motors. They had classifications as light as 1/2 ton trucks, and as heavy as 2 ton trucks. Additionally they produced the successful P-series of step van chassis and the value van. GM gasoline and diesel engines powered vehicles which, like competitors’ chassis, got bodies from outside suppliers. Large delivery fleets like FedEx, UPS and Frito-Lay were among its customers. Some later models were available with the Step Van/Value Van cab and Olson after-body. Motor Homes were built around Step-Vans & Value Vans; the GMC Motor Home (which was built between 1973 and 1978) was not related. The series was discontinued in the late 1990s and then became the Workhorse company (see separate entry below).
- Divco was making vehicles such as these from its inception in 1926. By the late 1930s they gained short curved hoods and separated fenders resembling the Chrysler Airflow doghouse. This design made them well known and remained virtually unchanged until 1986. By 1957, when the company bought Wayne Works they began manufacturing larger versions of these vans which did not contain typical 1930s design cues. A later version called the Dividend had a front resembling other walk-in vans which cut several inches off the length of the front portion of the truck. Some Dividends were fitted out as mini-buses with Wayne bus parts.
- The Dodge Route-Van was made between 1948 and 1951. It was succeeded by the Dodge Job-Rated, and was itself replaced with the Dodge P-Series, which like the Ford P-Series were stripped-chassis that could be fitted with made-to-order bodies. Chrysler manufactured these models until 1979.
- The Dodge 50 Series, later known as the Renault 50 Series, were light commercial vehicles produced in the UK by Chrysler Europe and later Renault Véhicules Industriels between 1979 and 1993 as a replacement for the earlier Dodge Walk-Thru stepvan and smaller Dodge Spacevan cab-over van. The HCV (High Capacity Van) was the stepvan version.
- Ford Vanette, Ford MTO-71 or Ford FFV was made between 1948 and 1970. Transportation Engineers (organized by Frank Brooks and Howard Perkins) began manufacturing Van Ette cab over engine delivery bodies for Ford truck chassis around 1936, but suspended production during World War II and Brooks & Perkins later spun out Vanette, Inc. as a subsidiary company in 1948. Post-war Vanette bodies were built by Correct Manufacturing in Delaware, Ohio and initially were marketed by both Ford (as the Model KZ) and Universal Sales (as the Vanette); both Correct Mfg. and Universal Sales were divisions of the parent company, Brooks & Perkins. In 1950, Ford began marketing it as the F-5 Parcel Delivery Van. It succeeded the Walk-In versions of the Ford F-Series trucks, and had the same grilles of the Ford F-Series from 1951-1955. In 1953, the chassis was redesignated as the Ford Parcel Delivery (P-Series). After 1956, the Vanette body retained the 1955 grilles until the complete Vanette body and chassis was discontinued in 1964, as the Ford Econoline had been introduced in 1961. The P-Series continued to be sold as a stripped-chassis that could be fitted with made-to-order bodies until the 1970s, and often contained red crests on the grilles reading "Chassis By FORD."
- International Metro Van was originally based on the 1937-40 D-Series trucks. Its name came about as its body was originally developed and built by the Metropolitan Body Company in Bridgeport, Connecticut; this company later became a wholly owned subsidiary of International Harvester. In the 1950s, they began producing variations such as the "Metro-Lite," "Metro-Mite," and "Metro-Multi-Stop" vans. There was also the bonneted "Metroette," which used versions of the front sheetmetal of International's contemporary pickup models. The design of this van remained nearly unchanged from its inception in 1938 until its full redesign in 1964. By 1972, all IHC Metro Vans were stripped-chassis that other manufacturers could build on, and after 1975, they were discontinued along with all other light-duty trucks except for the Scout, which was last made in 1980.
- Morgan Olson 'Route Star' MT45 and MT55 are built on a Freightliner chassis and could handle large delivery/commercial applications. It had a variety of features designed to fit the needs of businesses along with quick and easy access to cargo.
- Morris Commercial in England, made J-type van from 1949 until 1961, and the Austin 101 variant from 1957. The BMC LD5 (1955-66), also from this maker, was a true "step van" - it was a heavier chassis than the aforementioned models and was popular in cowl-chassis form. It was replaced by the EA (Easy Access) step van which lasted well into the 1970s.
- Pak-Age-Car Corporation and successors Stutz Motor Company and Auburn Automobile sold the Pak-Age-Car from 1926 until 1941.
- Precision, a small Arkansas based company made step vans and later by Phoenix Commercial Vehicles in Arizona.
- Studebaker had walk-in delivery vans. In 1963 they added ZIP vans, which existed until the company collapsed in 1966.
- Utilimaster has been building multi-stop delivery vehicles and other vans since 1973; currently they manufacture the Isuzu Reach in a collaboration with the Japanese manufacturer. In the 1980s and 1990s the company manufactured the aerodynamic, front-wheel drive Aeromate on their own chassis, using Chrysler's turbocharged four-cylinder or 3.3-litre V6 engines.
- White Motor Company originally built the White Horse from 1939 to 1942. Later, they built the White PDQ Delivery van between 1960 and 1966.
- Willys produced the Walk-In Willys Van from 1941 to 1942, which were based on the 441 trucks. After World War Two, most of Willys' truck manufacturing was concentrated on Jeeps, although Jeep did offer walk-in delivery type bodies for some of its pickups. Under ownership by Kaiser, Jeep built the FJ-3, FJ-3A, and FJ-6 delivery vans, and in 1975 AM General built the Jeep FJ-9. Jeep also supplied chassis for bodies made by Highway Products and other manufacturers.
- Workhorse Custom Chassis, an International Motors company, was started in 1998 by investors who took over production and sales of General Motors’ popular P-series Stepvan chassis when GM dropped it. International acquired Workhorse in 2005; AMP Electric Vehicles purchased acquired the Workhorse brand and the Workhorse Custom Chassis assembly plant in Union City, Indiana in March 2015, and adopted the name Workhorse Group Incorporated. For a short time Workhorse offered an integrated chassis-body product called MetroStar. As of 2016, Workhorse was offering the E-Gen step van with plug-in hybrid (or "extended range electric") drivetrain.

== Gallery ==
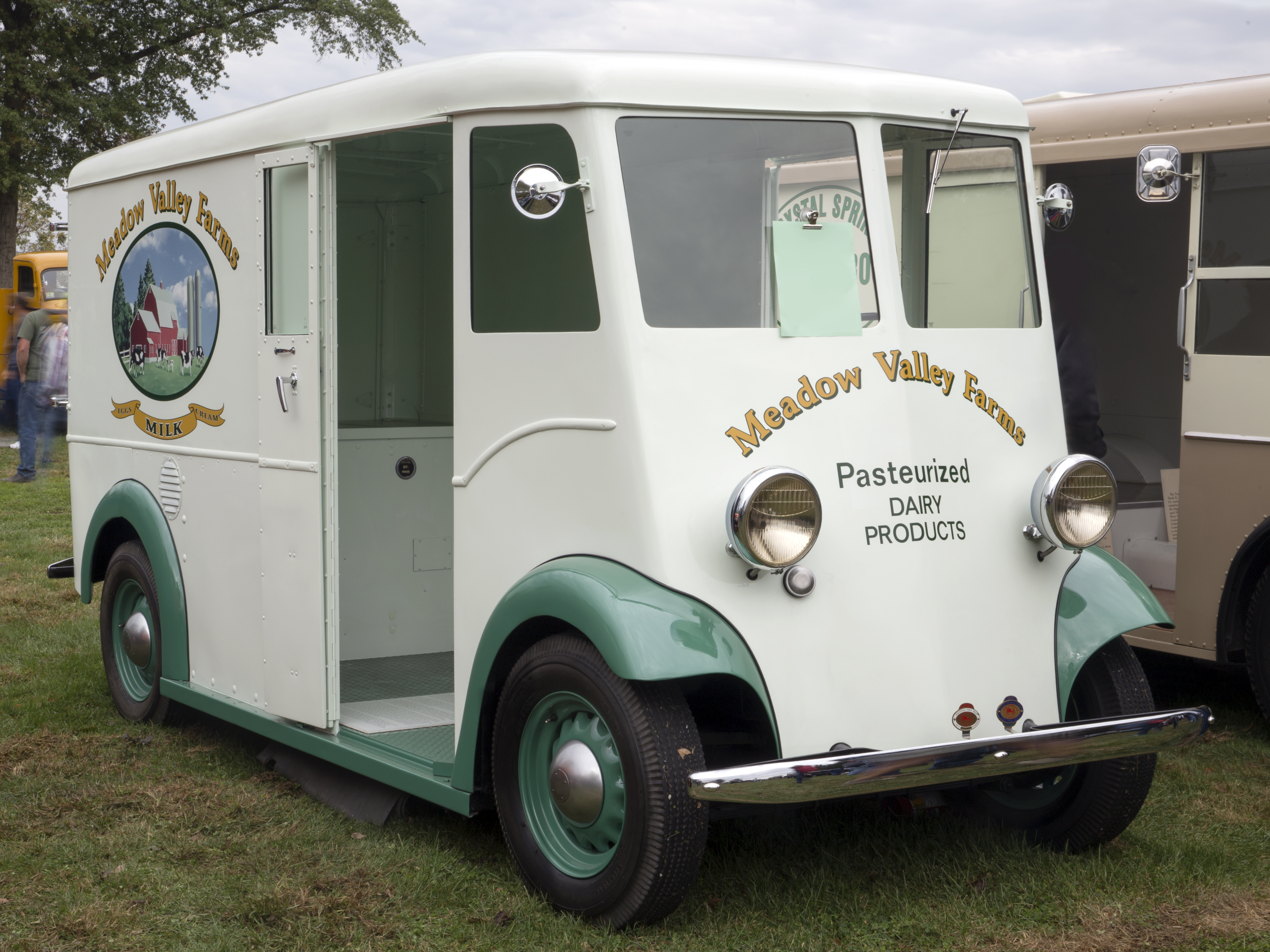
A restored Stutz Motor Company Pak-Age-Car truck from 1937

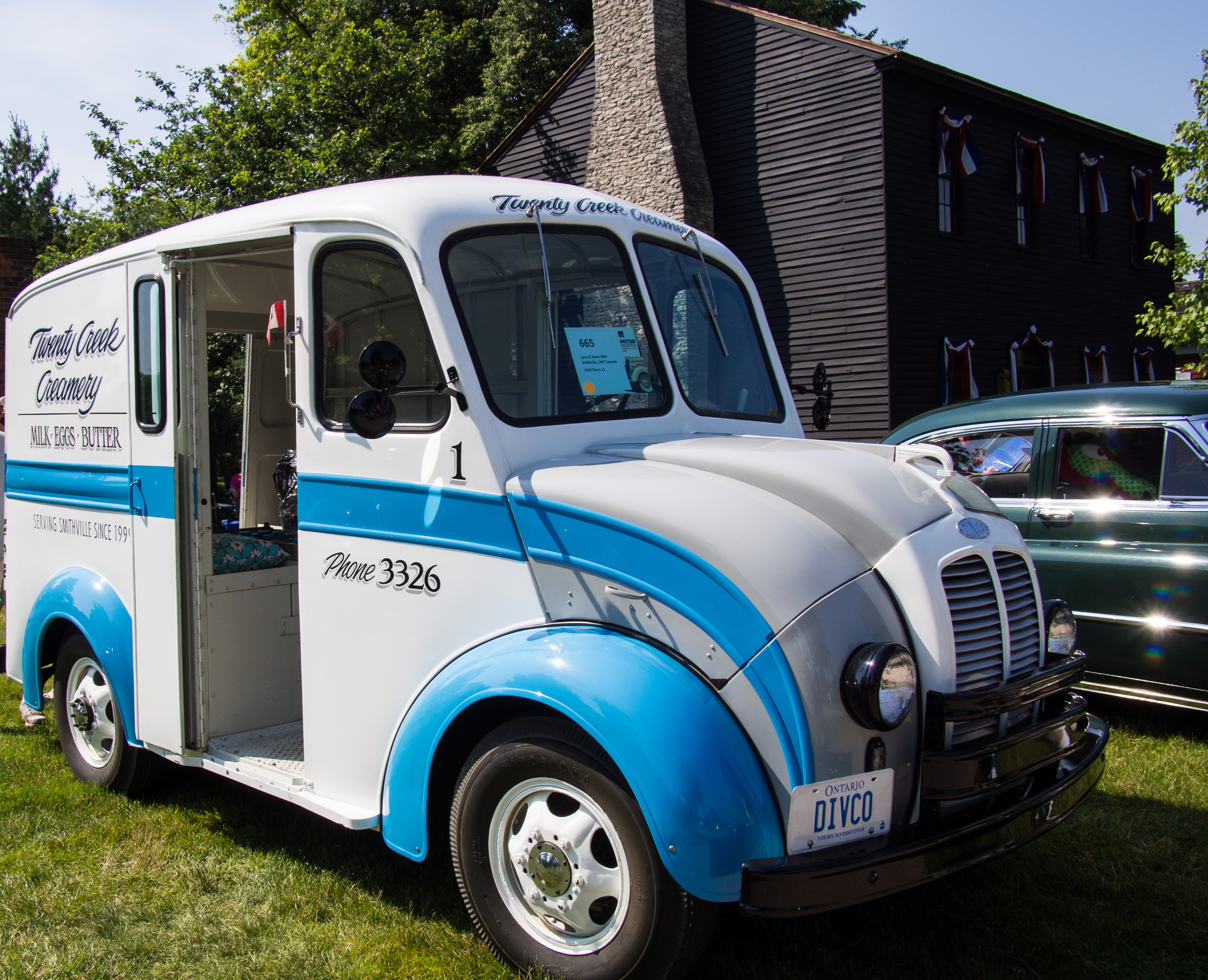
A 1950 Divco truck restored as a milk float

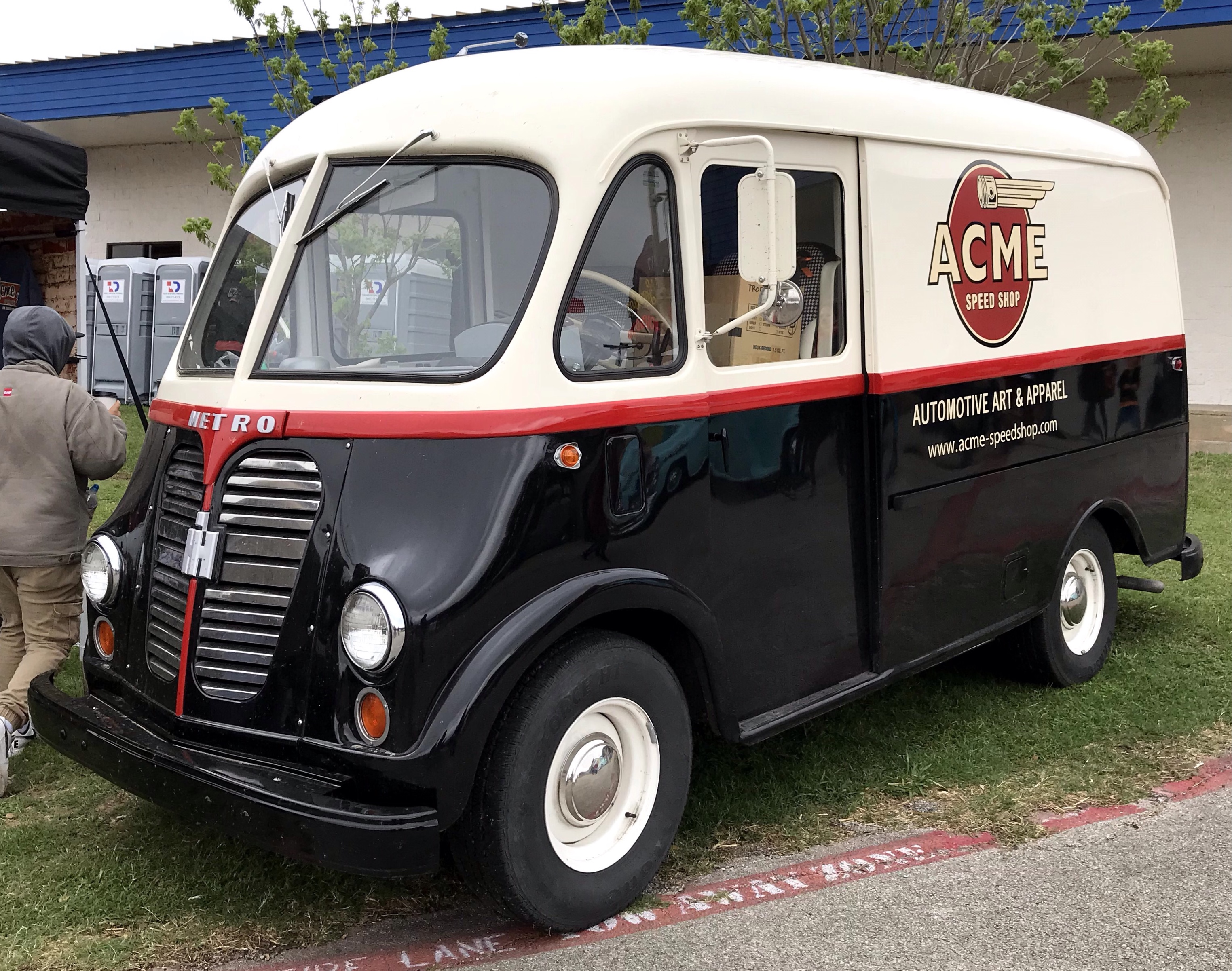
An International Metro Van restored and used to promote an automobile repair shop

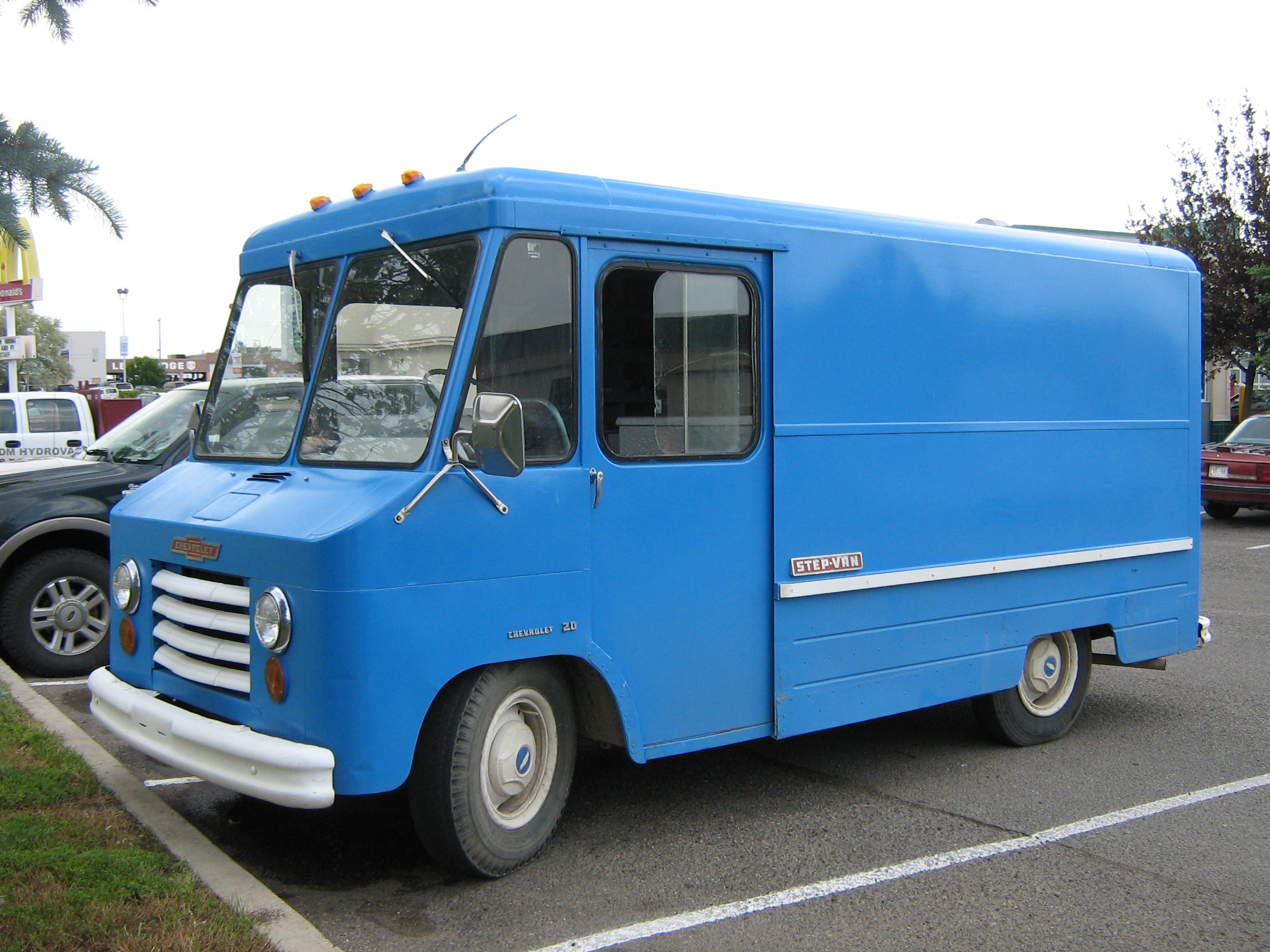
A 1964–1967 Chevrolet Step-Van King

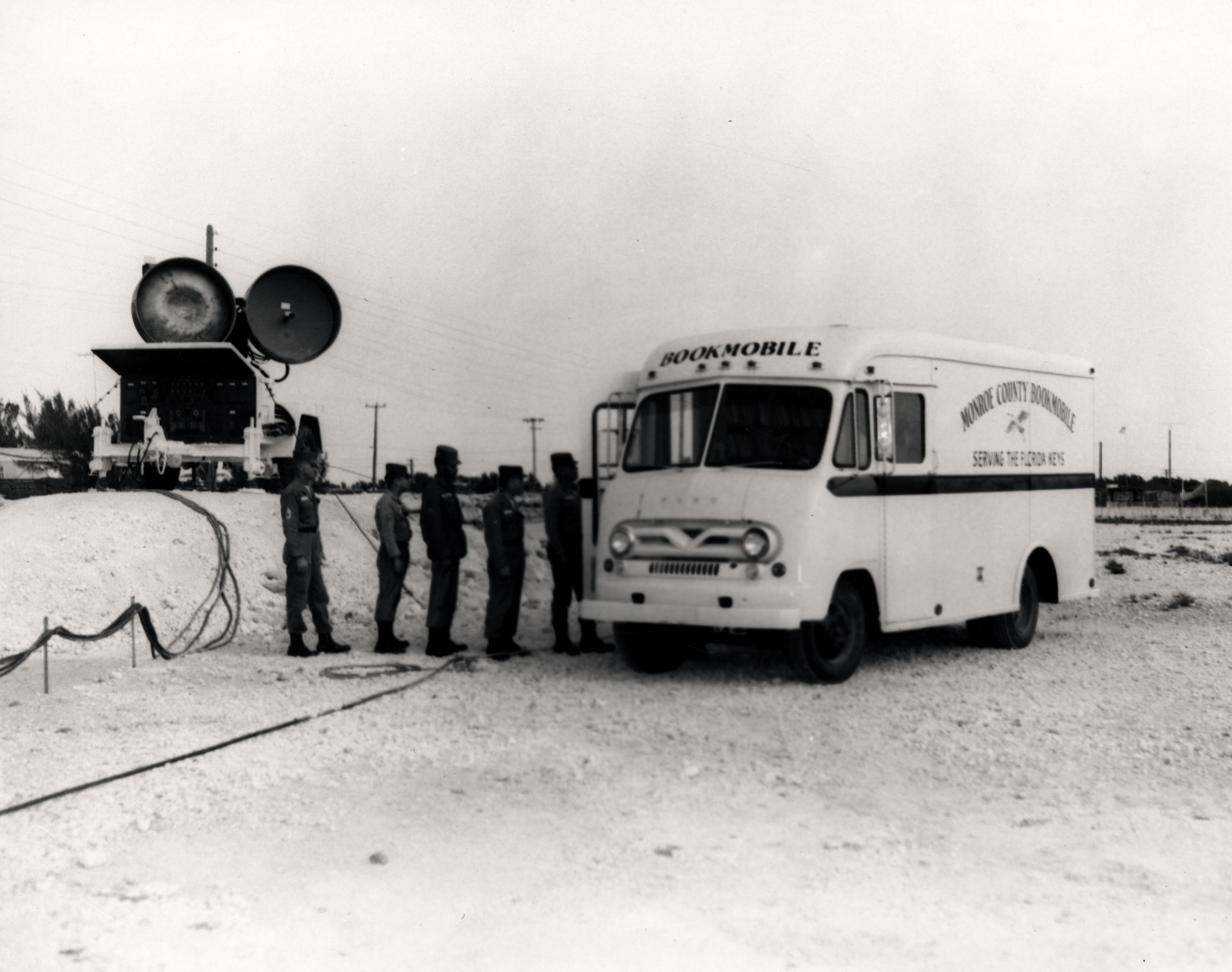
Ford Vanette bookmobile for Monroe County, Florida (1964)

UK Dodge 50 Series HCV

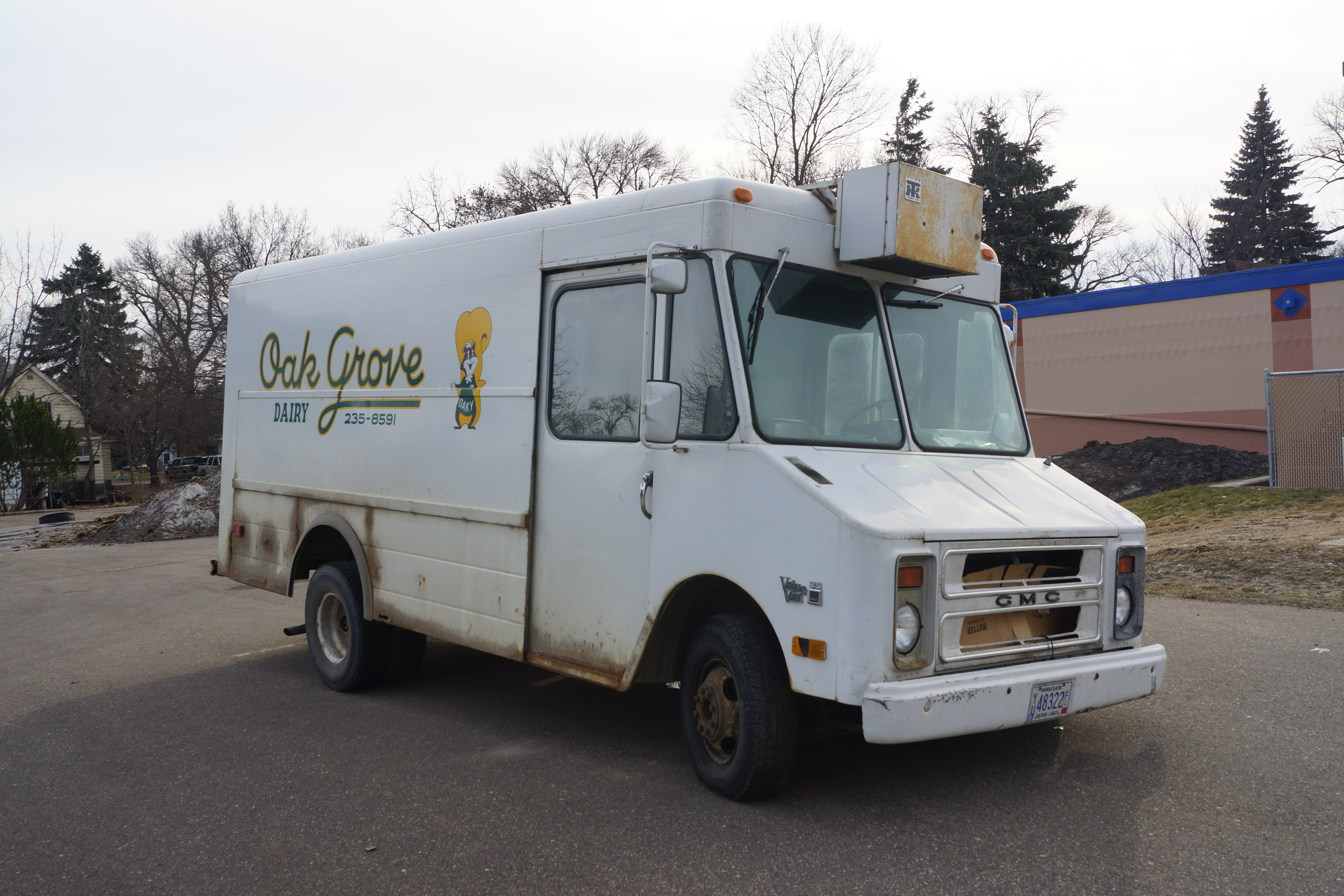
A GMC Value Van used as a delivery truck in Minnesota

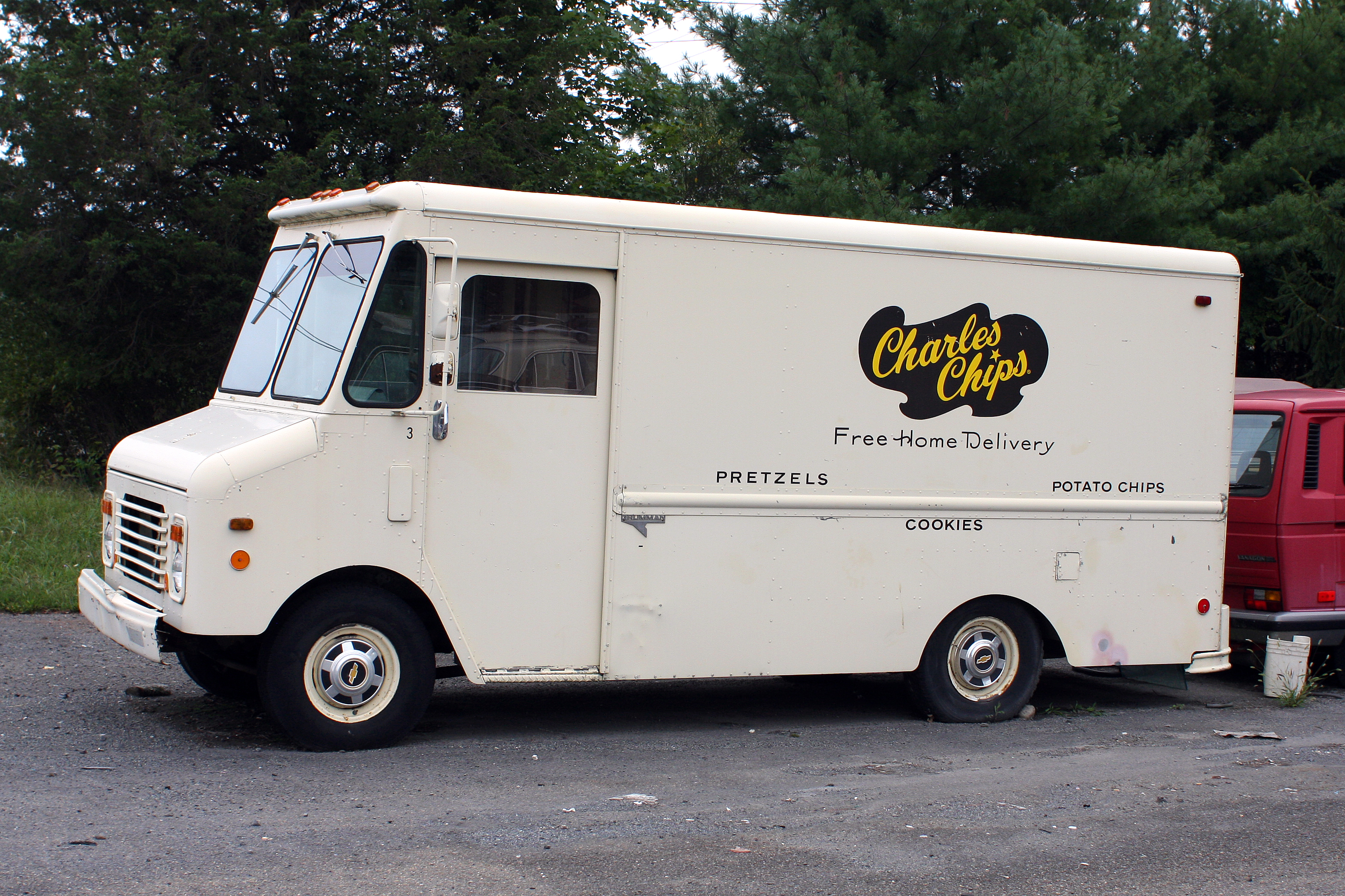
A Grumman Olson Kurbmaster used as a Charles Chips delivery truck

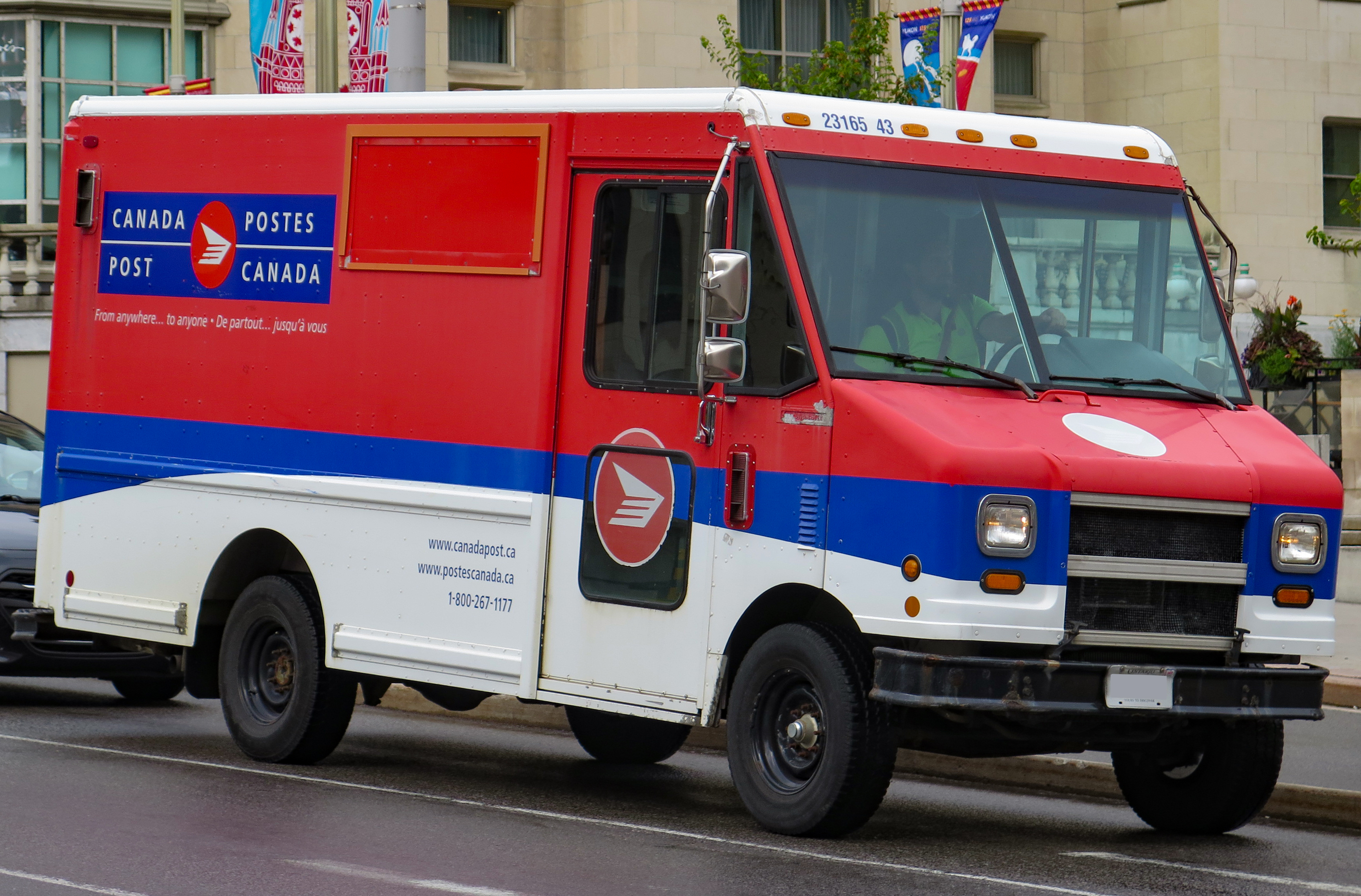
A Utilimaster Aeromaster used as a mail truck by Canada Post

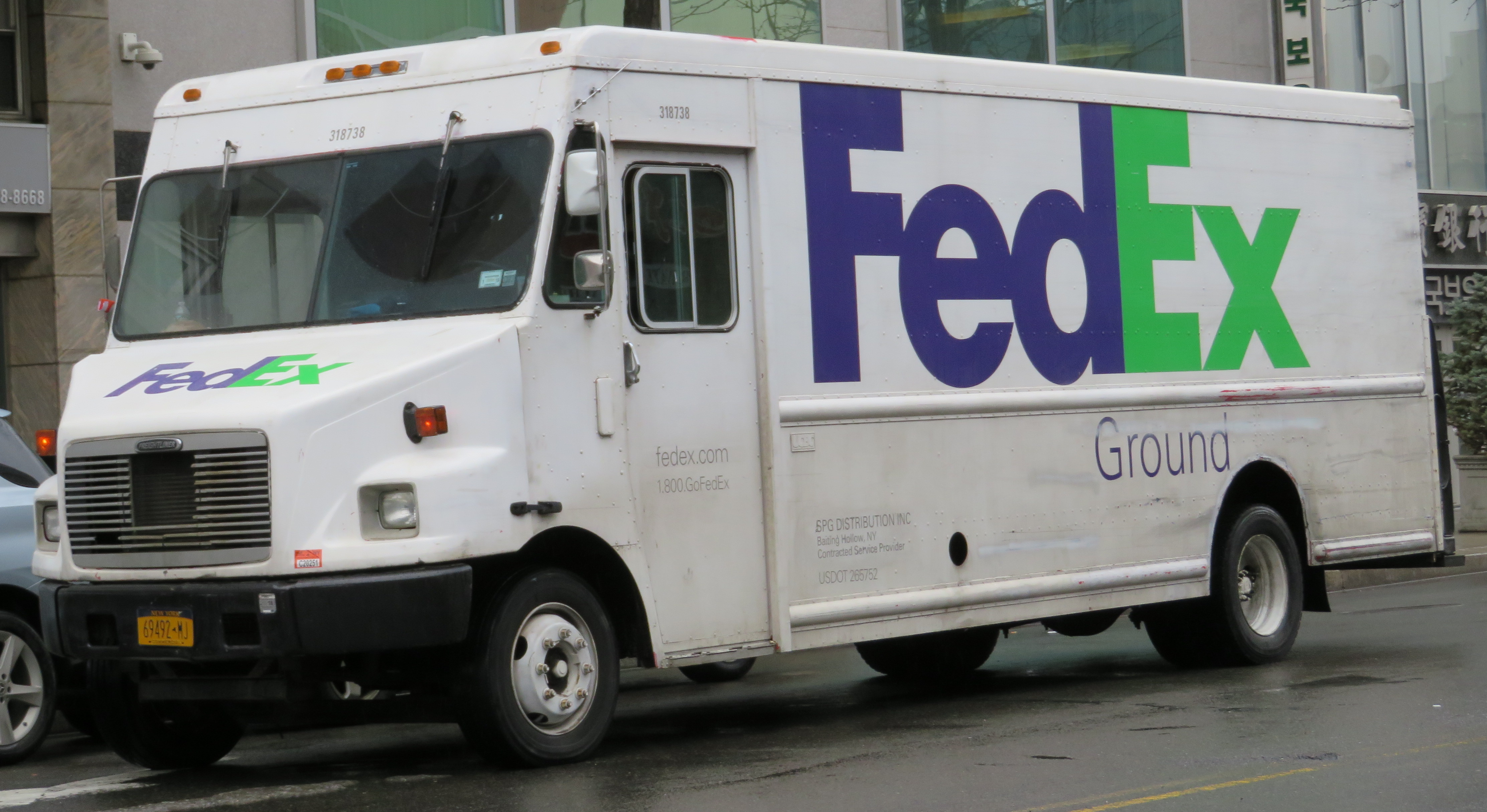
A Freightliner MT-Series used by FedEx Ground

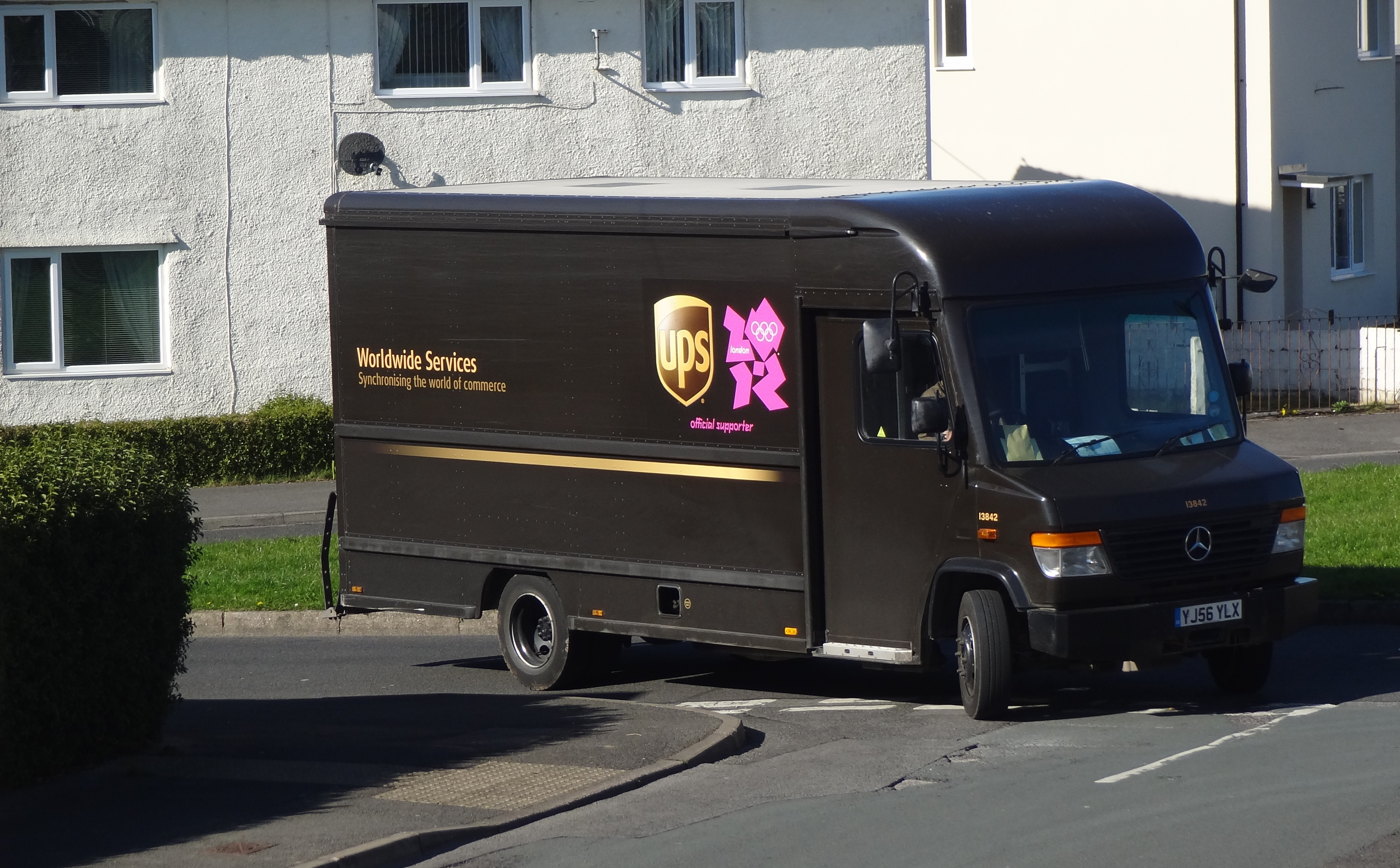
A Mercedes-Benz Vario truck used by United Parcel Service

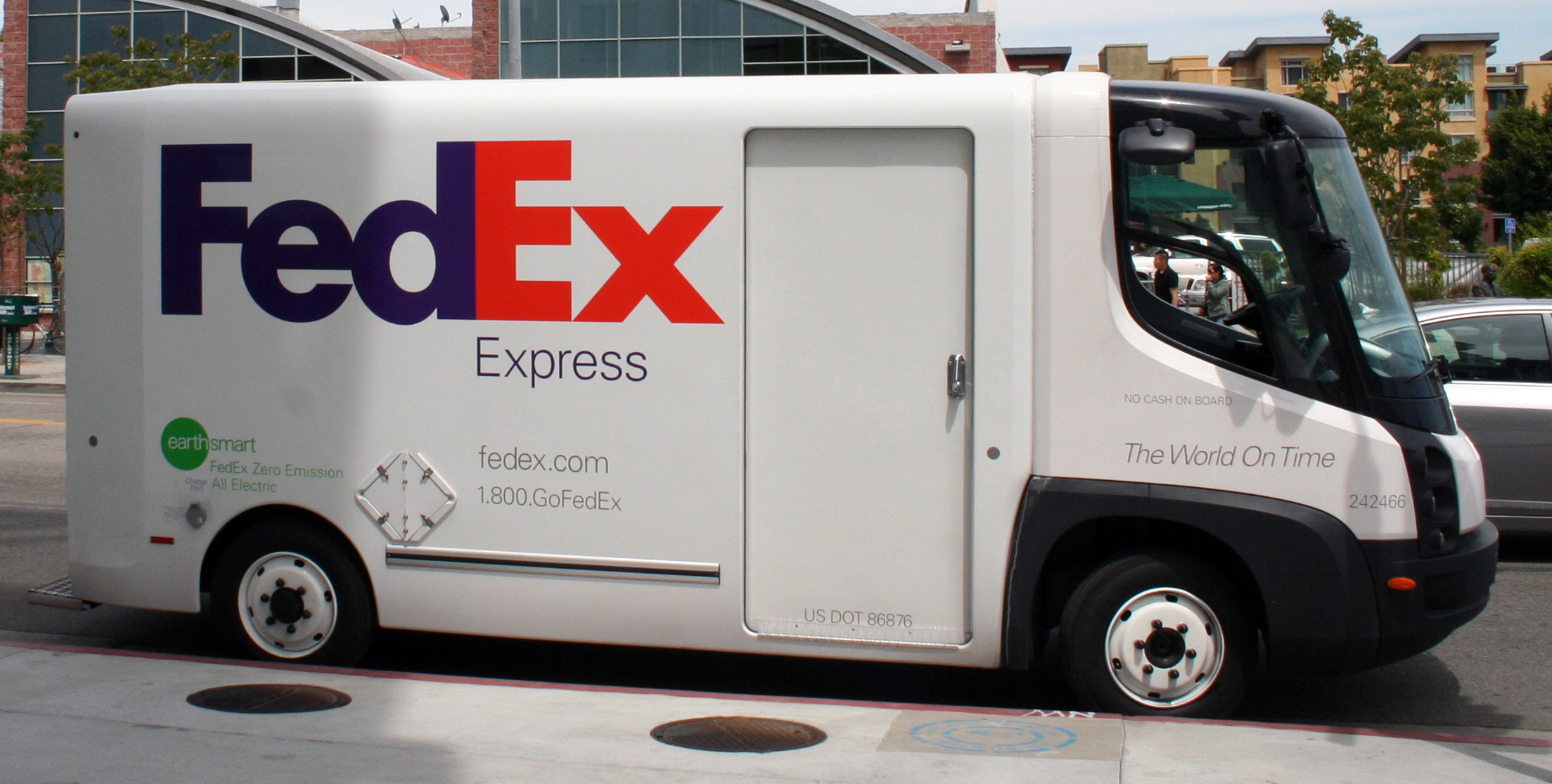
A Modec eStar electric van used by FedEx Express

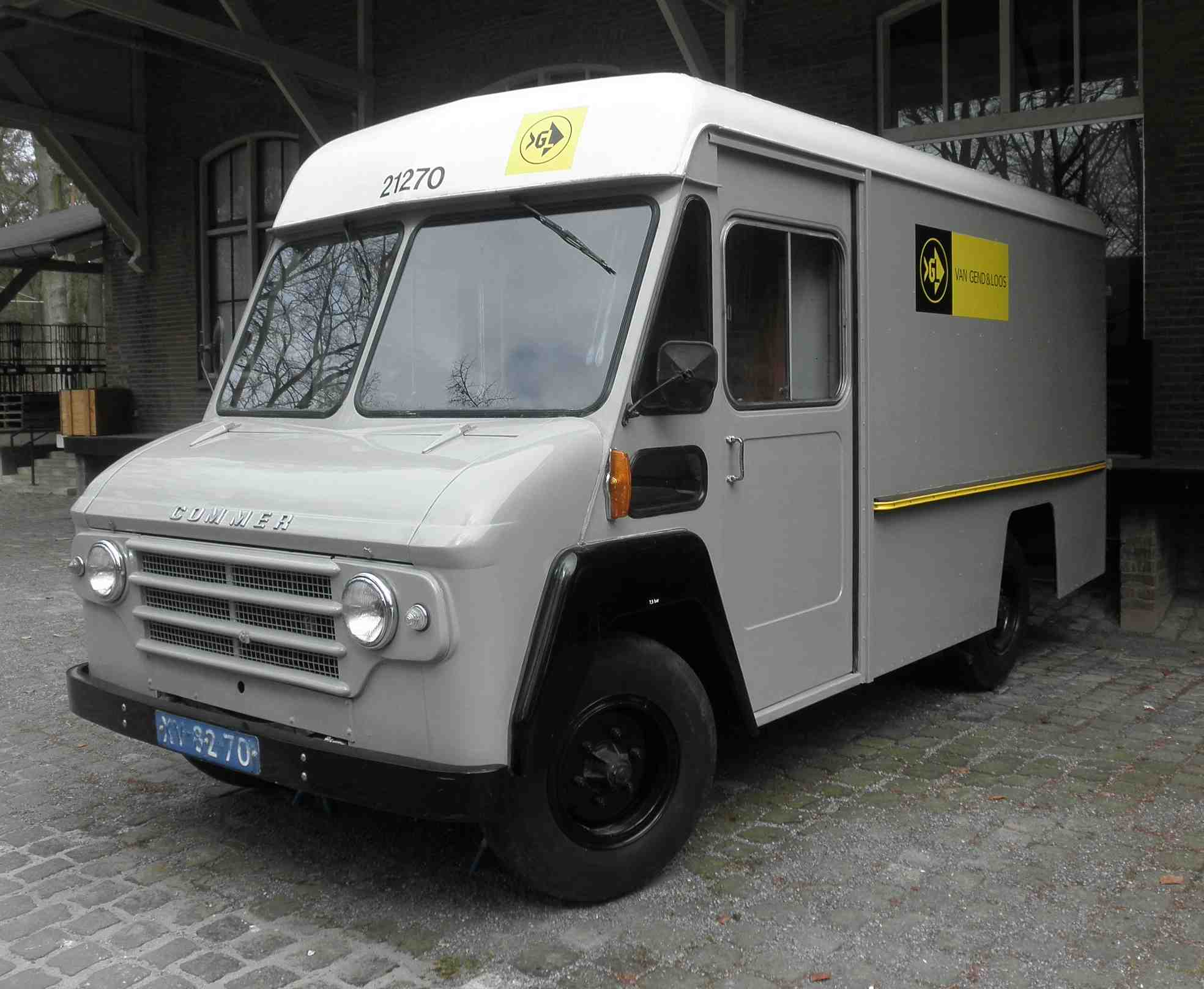
The Commer Walk-Thru van

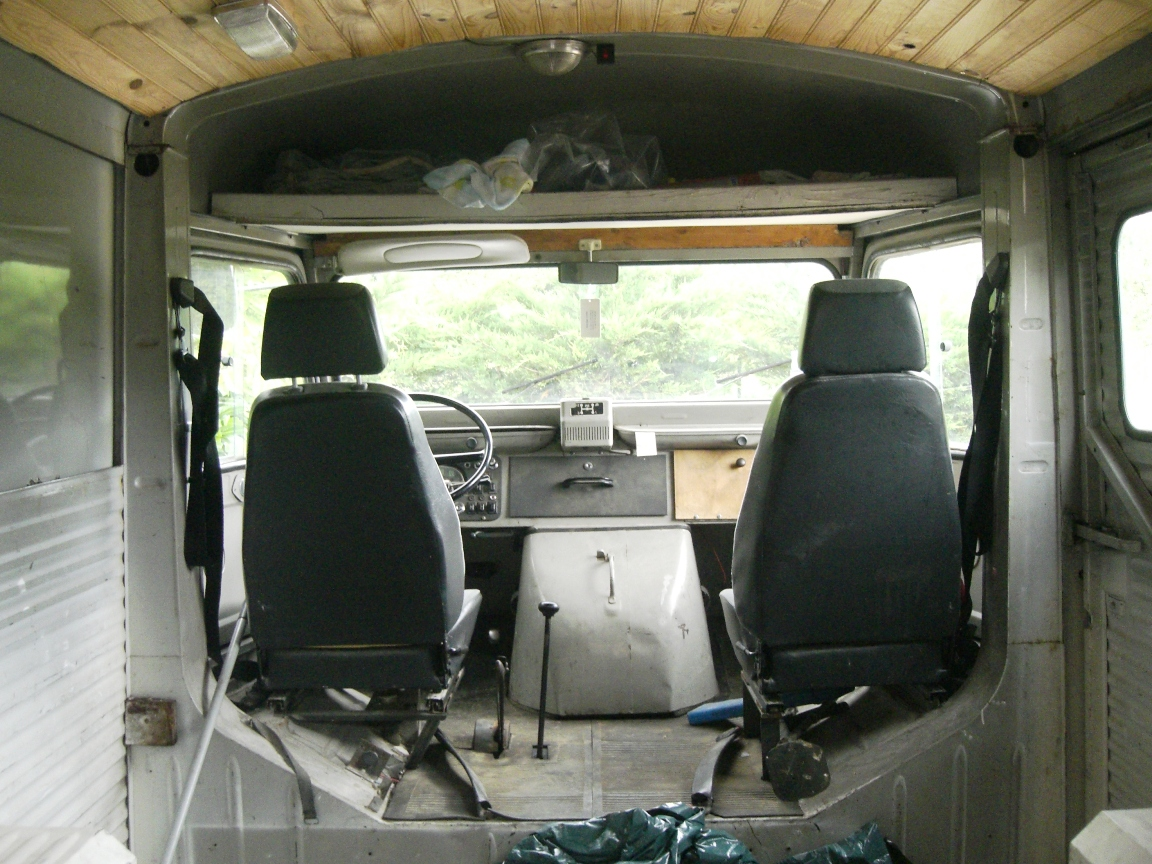
The interior of a Citroën HY van

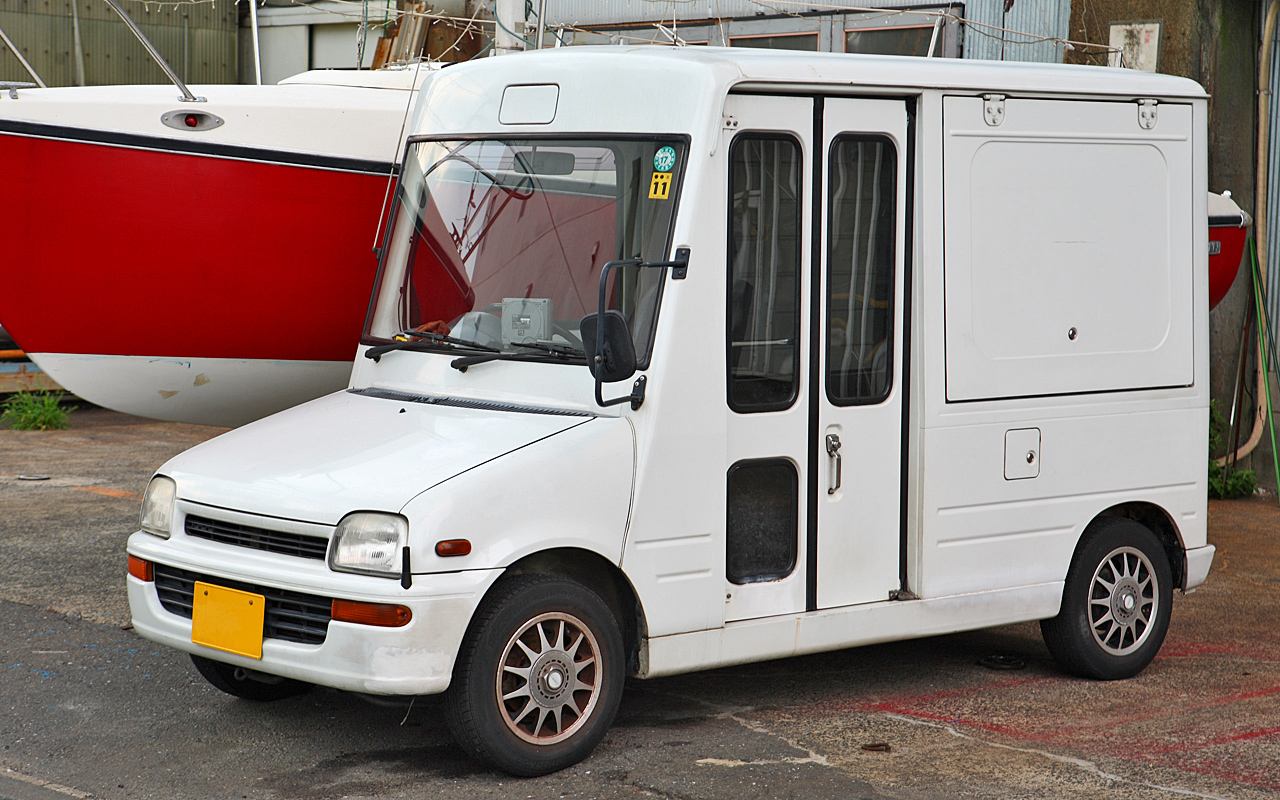
Daihatsu Mira Walk-through Van

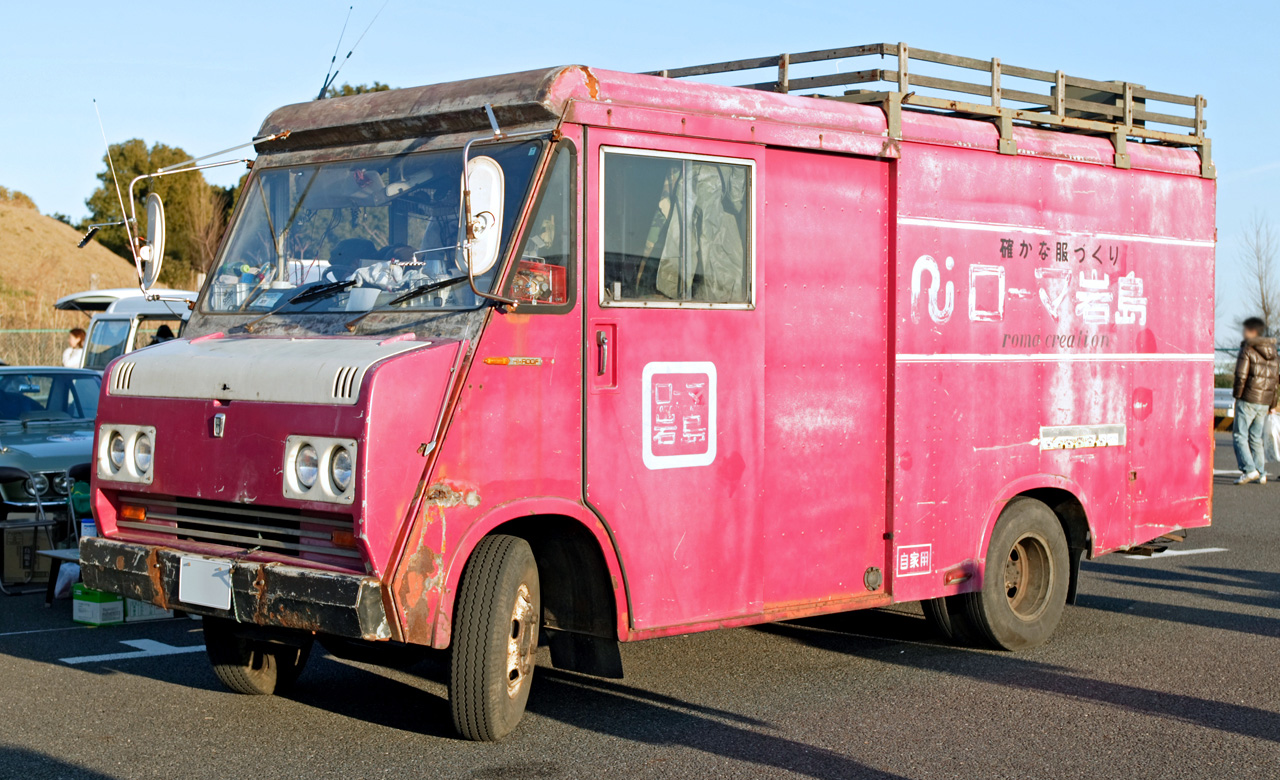
The 1968 Isuzu Elf High Roof

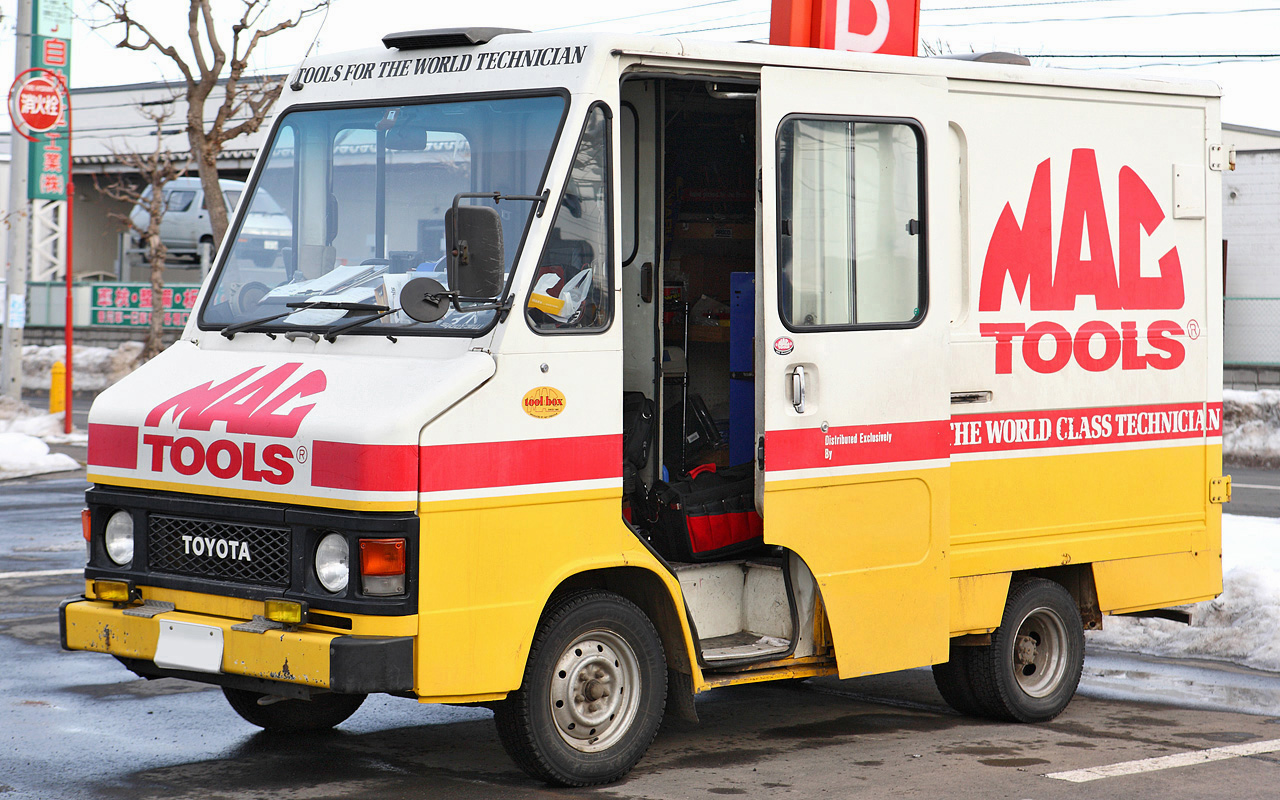
Toyota HiAce Quick Delivery (1982–1986)

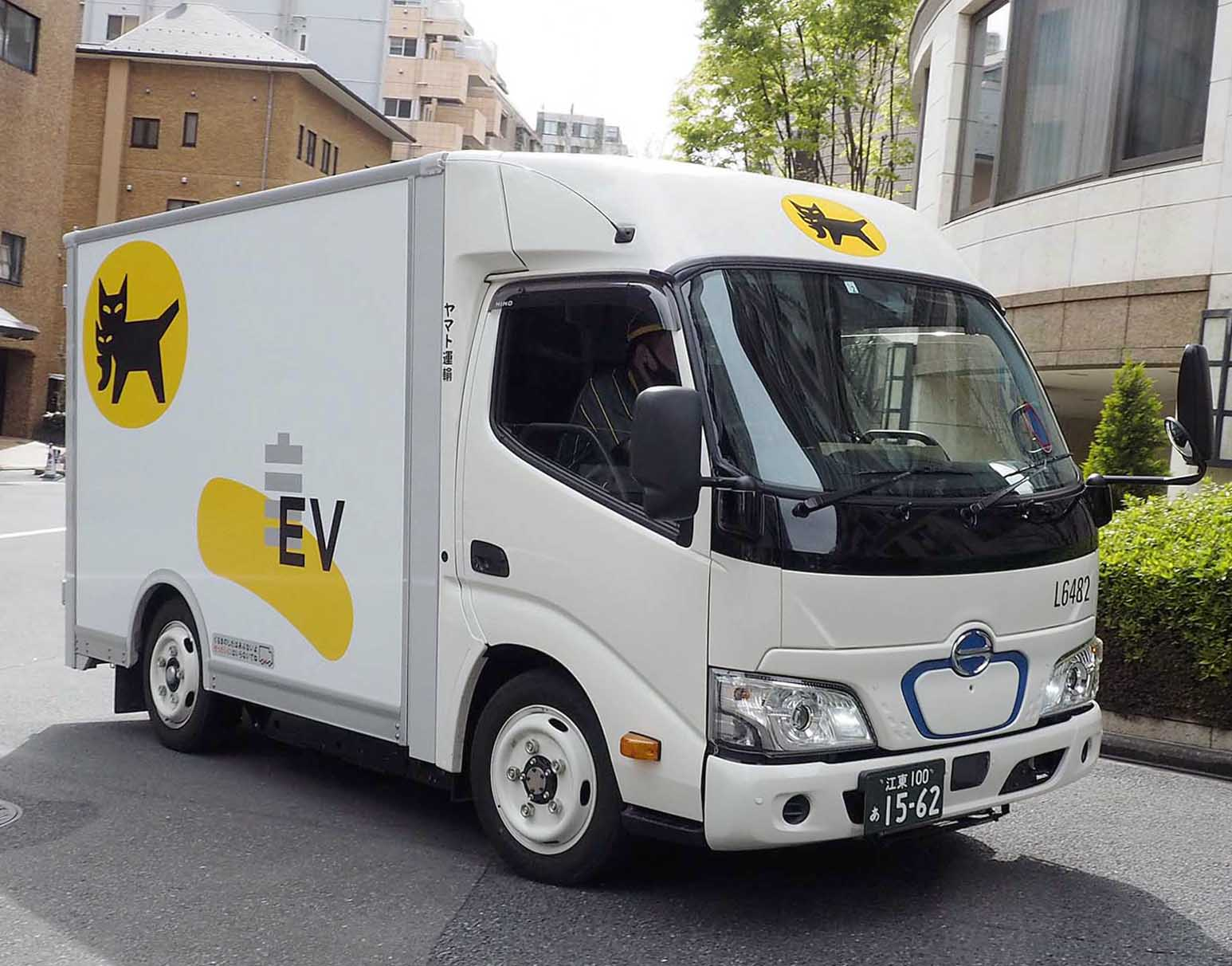
The Hino Dutro Z EV, in production since 2022

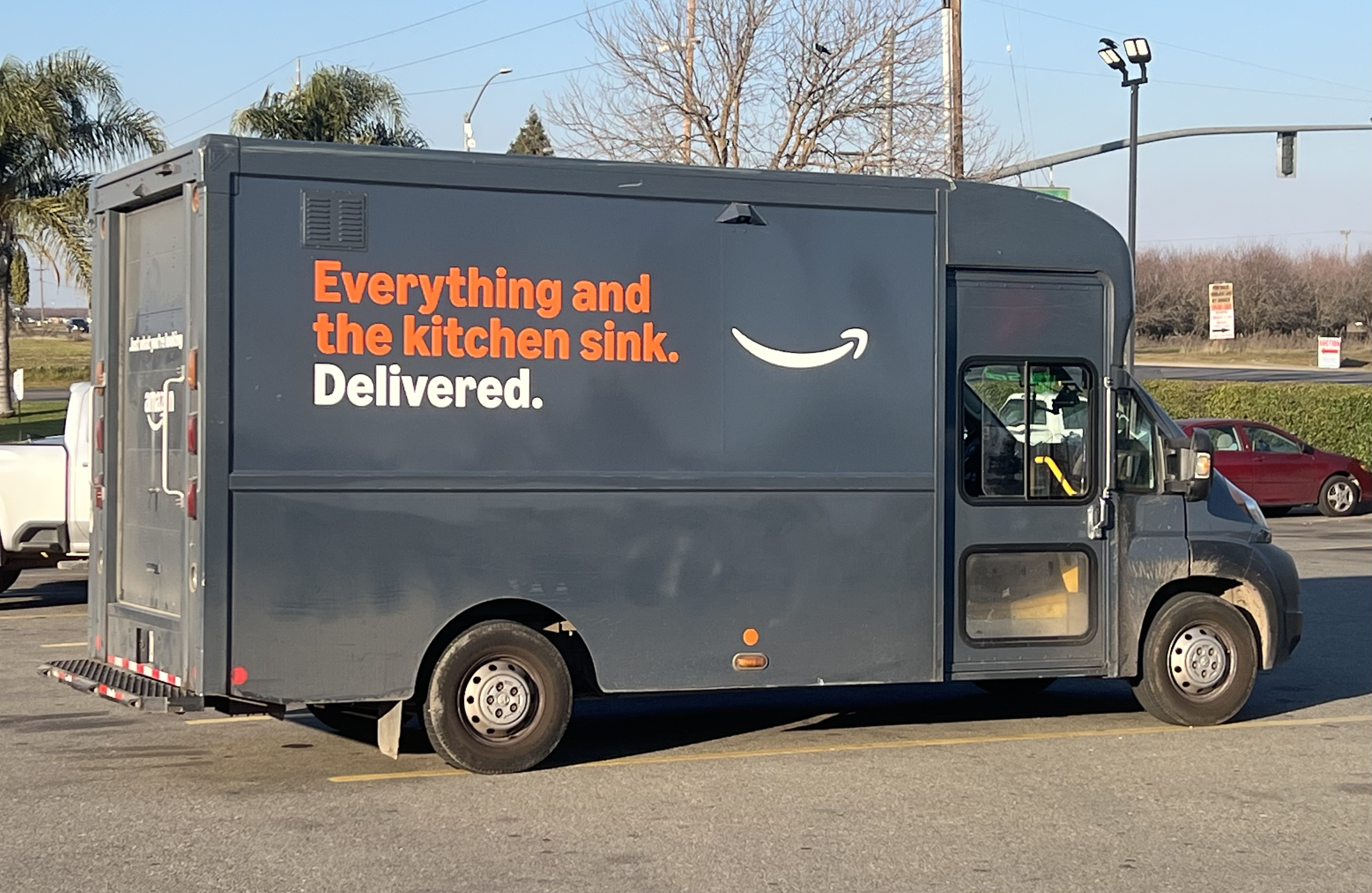
Ram ProMaster Cutway Van, conversion to Amazon Prime stepvan

== See also ==
- Cutaway van chassis
