= Pak-Age-Car =

Walk-in delivery van manufacturer

Pak-Age-Car Corporation
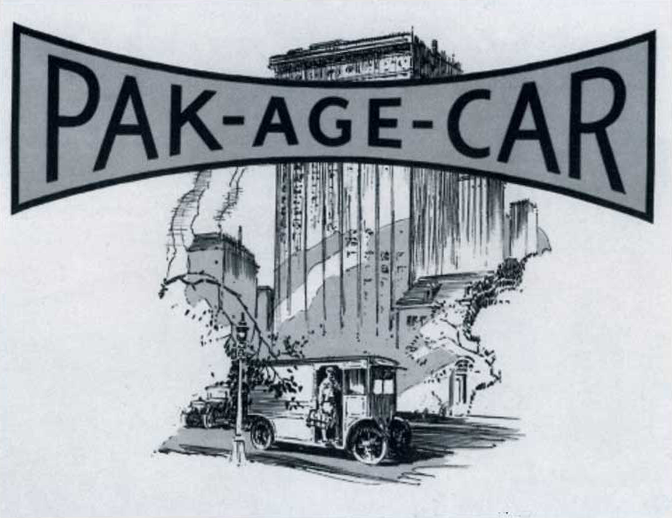
- Industry: Automotive
- Founded: 1926; 100 years ago
- Defunct: 1941; 85 years ago
- Fate: Merged
- Headquarters: Chicago, Illinois; Indianapolis, Indiana; Connersville, Indiana
- Products: Delivery trucks
- Owner: Mechanical Manufacturing Company (1926–1932); Stutz Motor Company (1932–1938); Auburn Central Company (1938–1941)

The Pak-Age-Car Corporation (originally Pac-Kar) was a Chicago-based company building a small walk-in delivery van from 1926 until 1941. The truck was designed to replicate what a horse-drawn delivery carriage could do, and looked a little like a horse-drawn wagon without the animal. The company belonged to the Mechanical Manufacturing Company of Chicago, and from 1927 on they were distributed through the Stutz dealer network.

Stutz Motor Company took over the company wholesale in 1932, hoping that the truck would save the failing company. The Pak-Age-Car company was not enough for Stutz to pin their hopes on. After Stutz's bankruptcy Auburn Central Company took over the Pak-Age-Car rights in 1938, moving the production line to their underutilized plant in Connersville, Indiana. Within a year, Auburn transferred the sales and service to Diamond T while retaining the Pak-Age-Car manufacture. With Auburn Central Company as well as Diamond T focusing on wartime production, Pak-Age-Car manufacture was halted for good in 1941.

Of the circa 3,500 built, only about ten Pak-Age-Cars are thought still to exist. Six are Stutz-made ones and the remaining four Diamond Ts. Working vehicles generally do not survive at the same ratio as passenger vehicles, and being built in an age before mechanical cooling systems Pak-Age-Cars delivering perishables were usually packed with ice to keep them cool. As a result of the melting ice, they quickly rusted away from the inside out.

== Early history ==
The concept was developed by two men named Oldfield and Rollston, both of Chicago, with the intent of providing a direct replacement for the horse. As late as 1933, Stutz's marketing material still contained a direct comparison with the horse. The first prototype was called the Pac-Kar, and was finished in 1925. Production commenced in 1926, on a small scale, but with very little financial backing the company did not build many vehicles in spite of continuous improvement and development. The company building these trucks changed names repeatedly, starting out as the Package Car Corporation, becoming the Mechanical Manufacturing Company, and finally Northern Motors, Inc. Several of these firms had connections with the Swift meatpacking empire, likely aiding the company in moving inventory.

The original version was narrow, with a cab 52 inches (130 cm) wide and a completely flat front end. The driver stood, there being no seat, and could exit either side of the doorless cab for speedy deliveries. Brakes, clutch, and throttle were all hand operated, with levers either side of the cab. The very square body was of a frameless steel and wood sandwich construction and sat on a 92 1/2 in (2,350 mm) wheelbase, with the front wheels projecting about halfway in front of the cabin. The engine was a 7-horsepower horizontally opposed two-cylinder made by the Hercules Engine Company. The entire drivetrain was designed as a quickly removable module for ease of repair. The manufacturer said it took only 15 minutes to swap the drivetrain package; this could be carried out with no effect on the payload.

== Stutz era ==
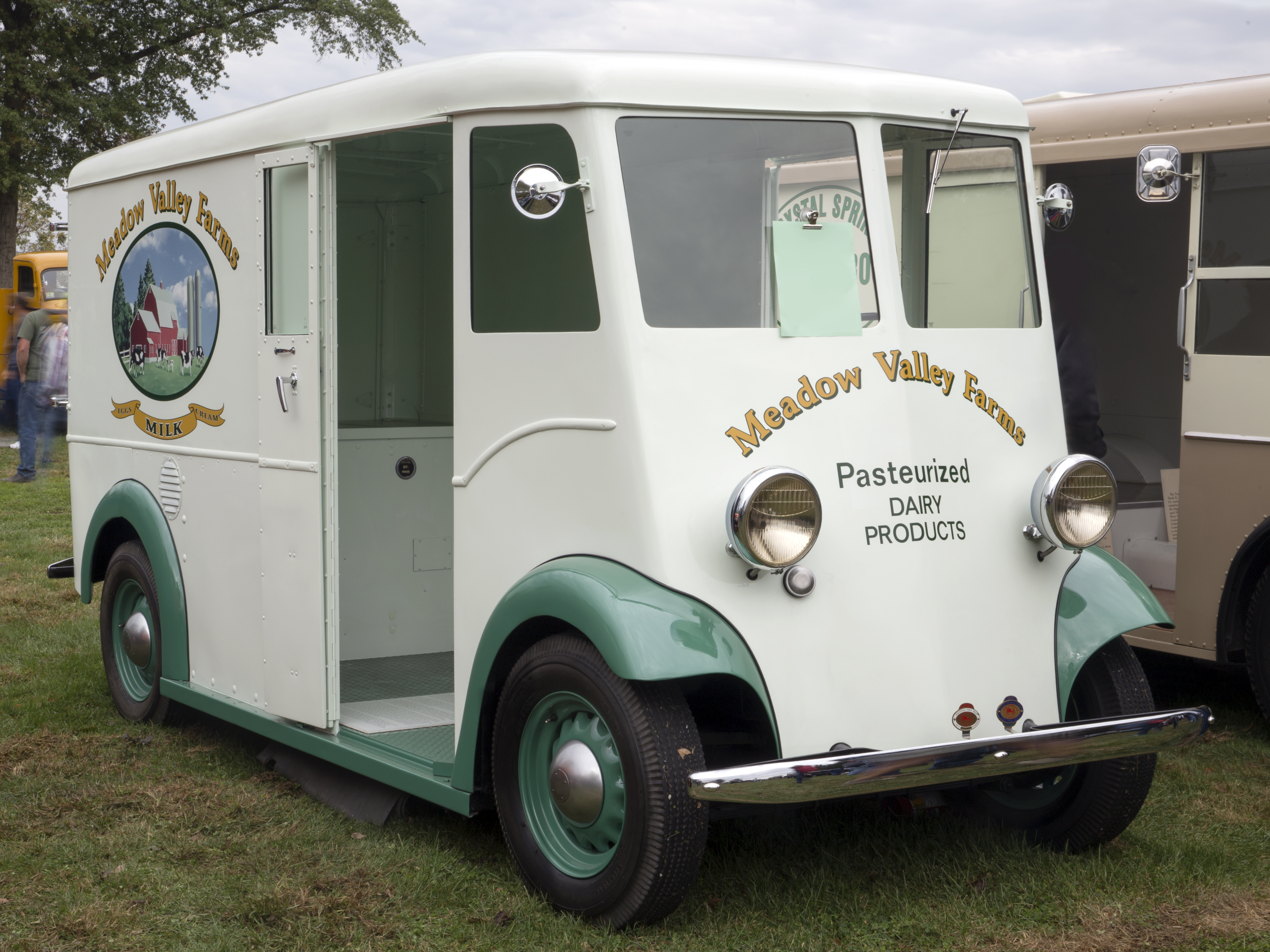
1937 Stutz Pak-Age-Car, long wheelbase version

Stutz sales were stagnant through the 1920s; picking up the Pak-Age-Car distribution in 1927 added some much-needed business. Stutz sales collapsed entirely with the Depression and in an effort to stay afloat, on 15 November 1932 Stutz took a controlling interest in the troubled Pak-Age-Car company and promptly moved the manufacture to their Indianapolis plant, with manufacture beginning by March 1933. These were redesigned by Stutz: sitting on a 90 in (2,290 mm) wheelbase the sheet metal received rounded corners, it enclosed the rear wheels, and the front edge of the roof tapered down somewhat. The hand controls remained and the front wheels still acted in lieu of a front bumper. The overall effect was still that of a box with wheels. Instead of the early two-cylinder, the first Stutz Pak-Age-Car was now equipped with American Austin four-cylinder, 747 cc (45.6 cu in) engines (a change which may have taken place as early as 1930) and also facelifted. In January 1935, Stutz announced that they would no longer build passenger cars, focusing their efforts entirely on the Pak-Age-Car.

Stutz believed it possible, even announcing new hiring in November 1935 to meet anticipated demand for the Pak-Age-Car. They also redesigned and reengineered it for the 1936 model year, giving it a new, more conventional look with a V-shaped front with a split windshield and attached front fenders. The engine, still in a convenient module, was switched to a four-cylinder Hercules IXA unit of 113.1 cu in (1853 cc). Weight for the new Model 90 was up from the original 1,800 to 2,650 lb (820 to 1,200 kg), with payload ranging from 2,000 to 3,600 lb (910 to 1,630 kg). The new design also offered the option of sliding side doors as well as different rear door layouts. Stutz also presented a long-wheelbase version at the 1936 National Bakers' Conference. The wheelbase was extended to 116 in (2,950 mm) and the provision of a driver's seat was made.

On May 3, 1936, Stutz announced that ex-Marmon man George H. Freers was the Package Car Company's new Chief Engineer. His tenure was not long, as Stutz filed for bankruptcy in April 1937. With firm orders for over 400 vehicles and decent prospects for more, company management hoped that the Pak-Age-Car would be able to save the company. The courts disagreed, and liquidation plans were offered in August 1937. With the court's permission, another 100 Pak-Age-Cars were finished that November to fill standing orders. There were plans to form a new, separate company to continue manufacture in the old Stutz premises, but they came to nought. The rights to the Pak-Age-Car then reverted to Northern Motors of Chicago, who sold the company to Auburn in August 1938, transferring the rights and the tooling to Indiana. Stutz was liquidated in April 1939.

== Diamond T era ==
On August 25, 1938, the new Pak-Age-Car Corporation was formed by Auburn Central Manufacturing Corporation — what remained of the A-C-D empire. Auburn's vice-president, Roy H. Faulkner, was the president of the new company. After their own recent bankruptcy, Auburn did not have any sales network left to speak of, and in March 1939 they announced that service and distribution of the Pak-Age-Car would henceforth be carried out by Diamond T while the manufacture remained in their Connersville plant. The Auburn Central Manufacturing Corporation took over the Pak-Age-Car trademark in December 1938, stating that the company was in the business of manufacturing vehicles, excluding engines.

Production had recommenced on October 15, 1938, along with some minor changes, including a switch to engines made by Auburn-owned Lycoming. These were the 220.89 cu in (3620 cc) 30 hp (22 kW) CT type L-head engine, although some sources indicate that the DC type was fitted. The rear axle was from the Columbia Axle Company, another Auburn subsidiary. The two wheelbases offered remained as before, and the Auburn-made cars can easily be recognized by having rounded corners and distinct rubber gaskets on the windshields. The Auburn-made cars also have different steel wheels with slightly larger hubcaps. They were marketed as the Model 91 and Model 117, respectively.

Some period spare parts brochures list the Pak-Age-Car as having been available until 1946, but most sources do not support this. With Auburn converting their plant to focus on building Jeep bodies and B-24 Liberator wings for the war effort, Pak-Age-Car production was discontinued in March 1941.
