= Divco =

Defunct American motor vehicle manufacturer

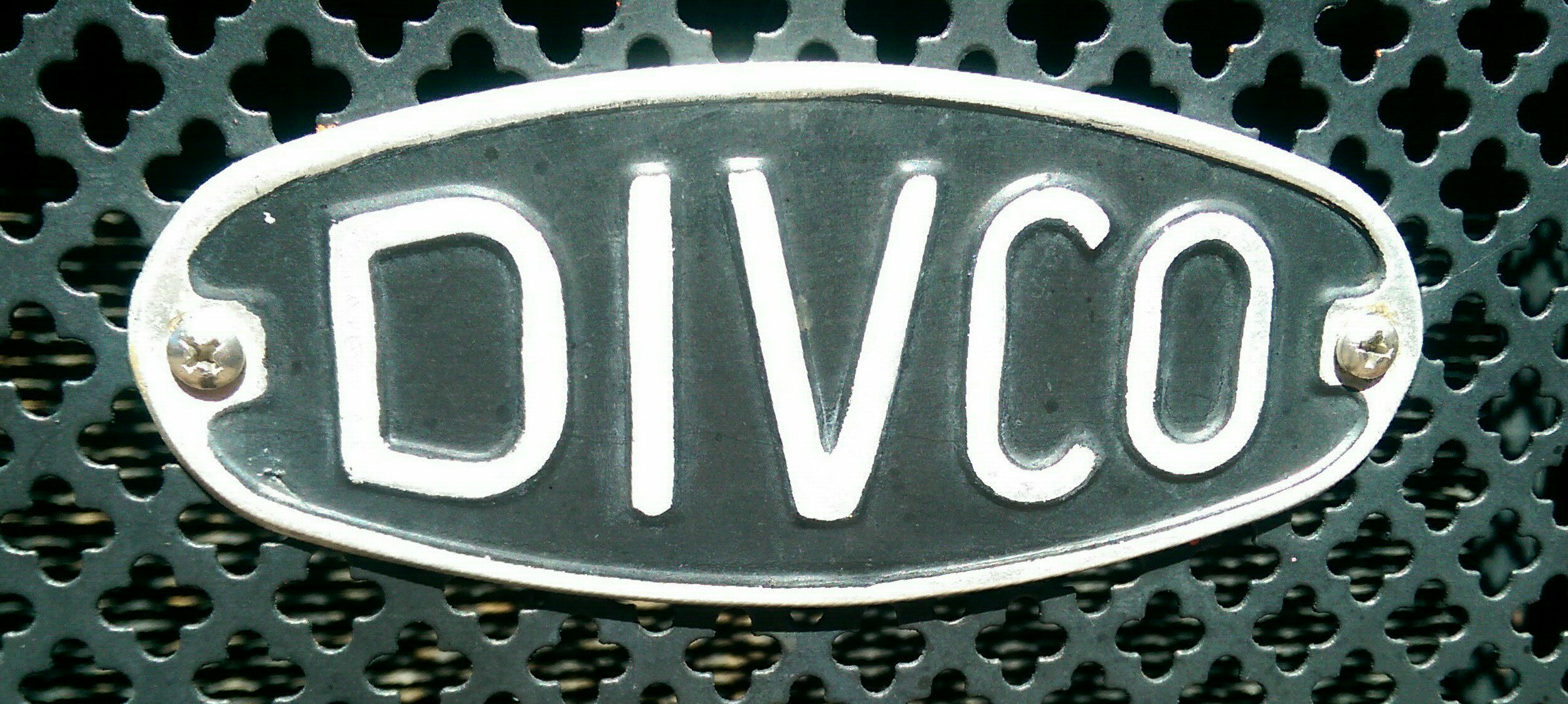
Divco badge

Divco Meadowlark Dairy truck

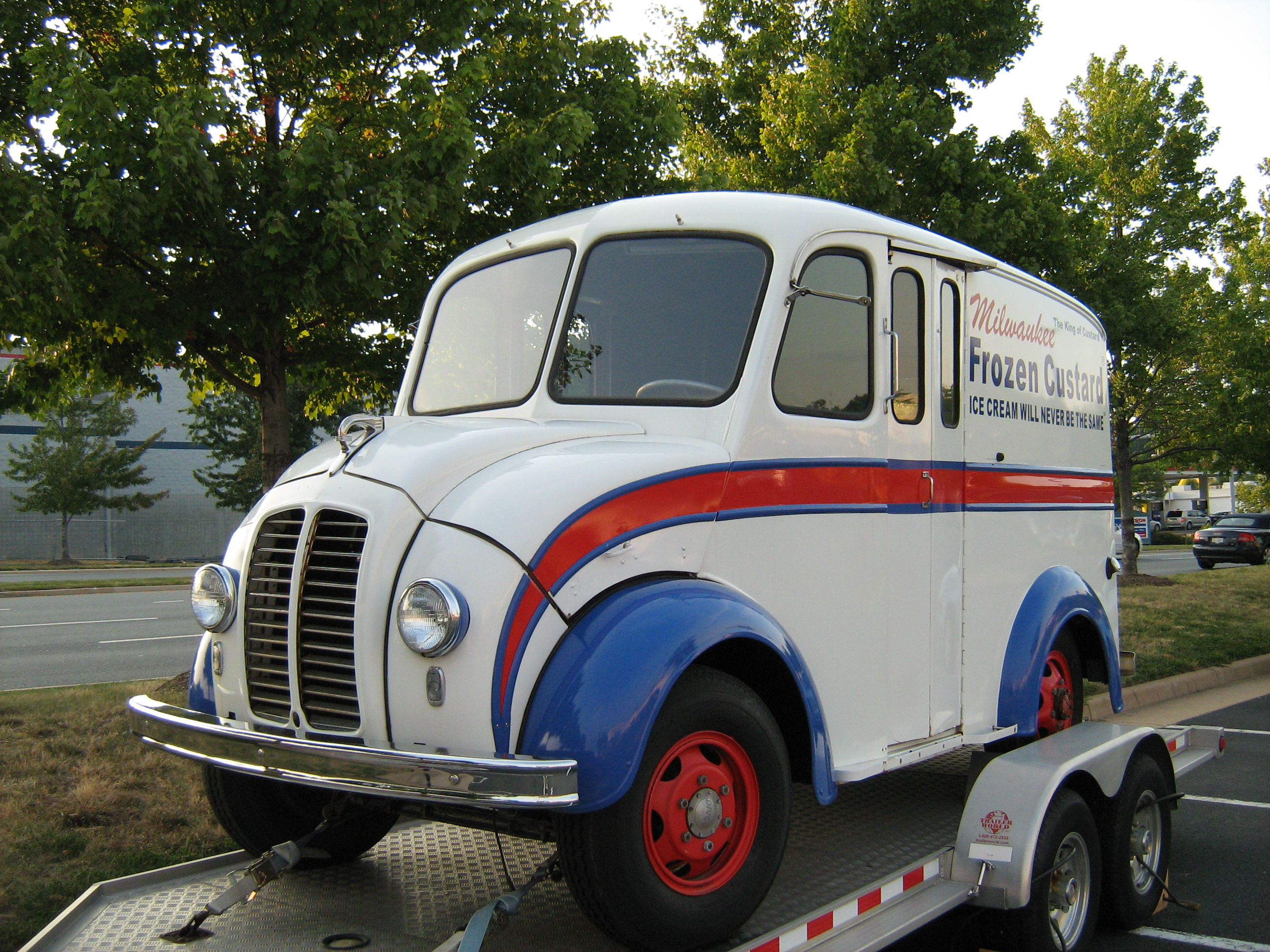
Divco delivery truck

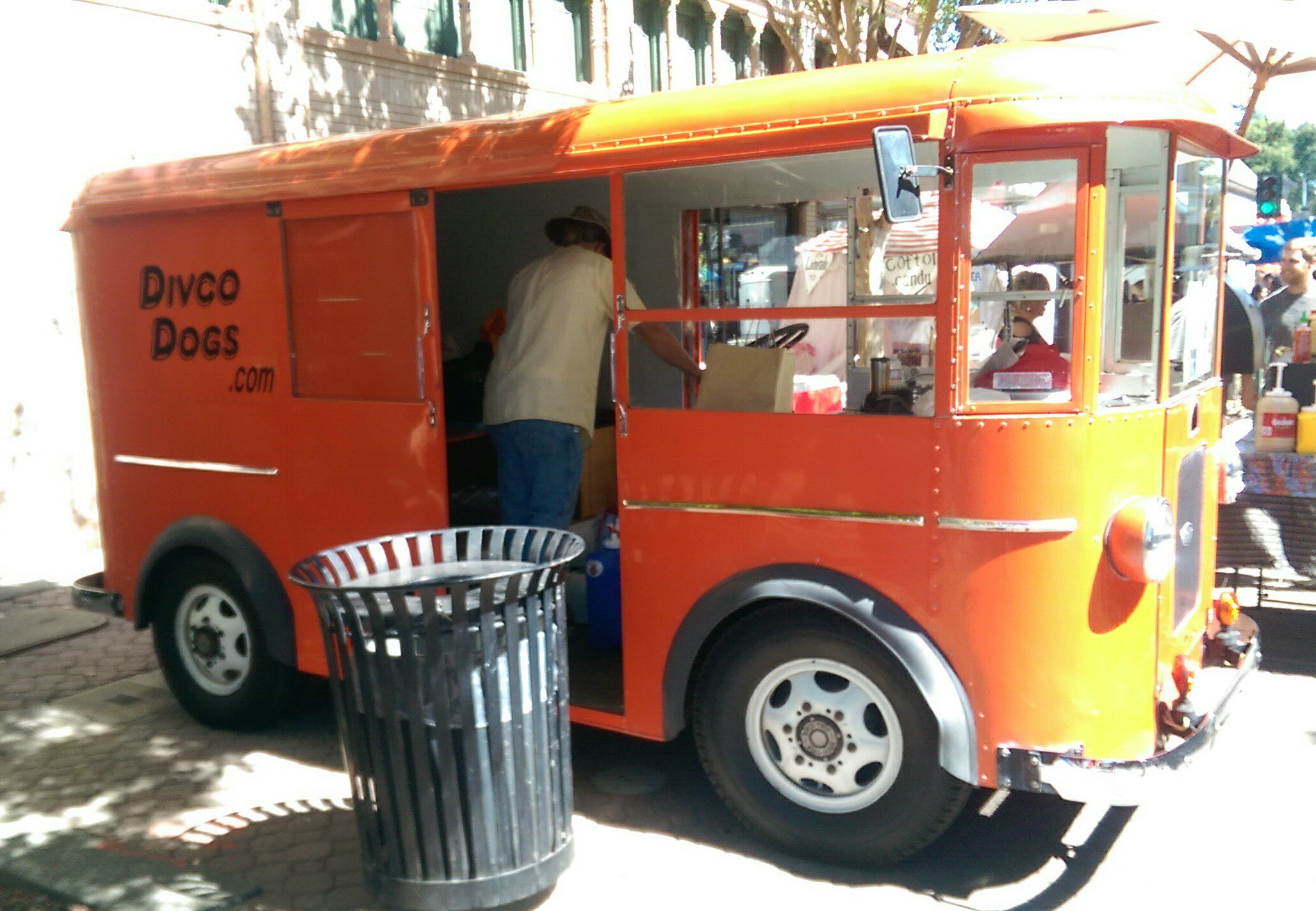
Divco Twin 1938 in Napa, California

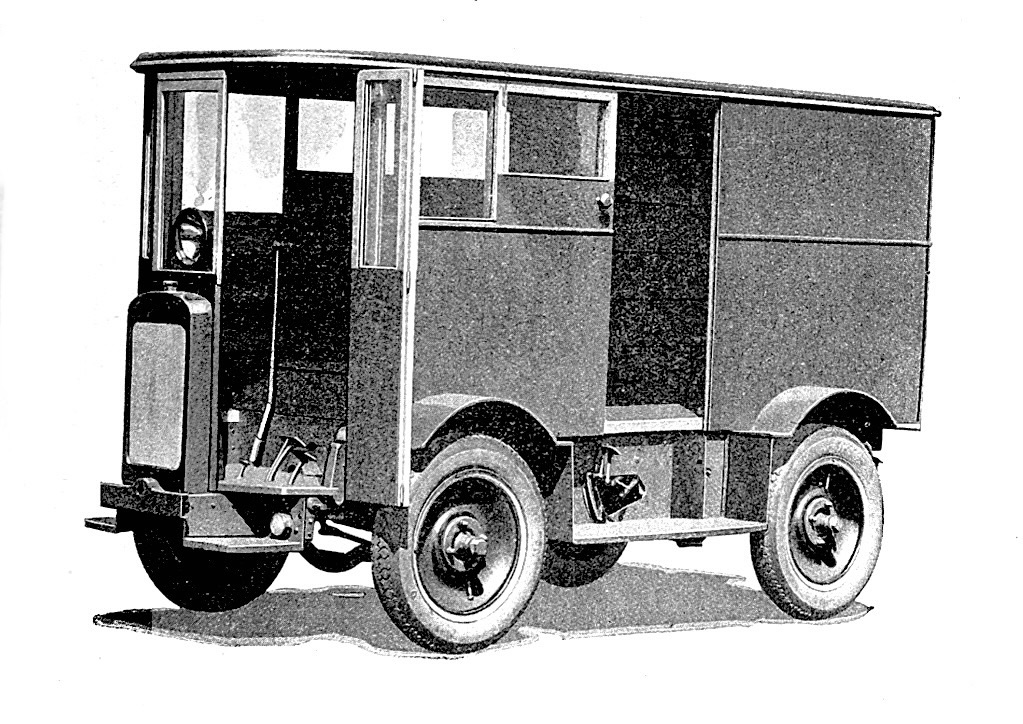
Divco Motor Truck (1925)

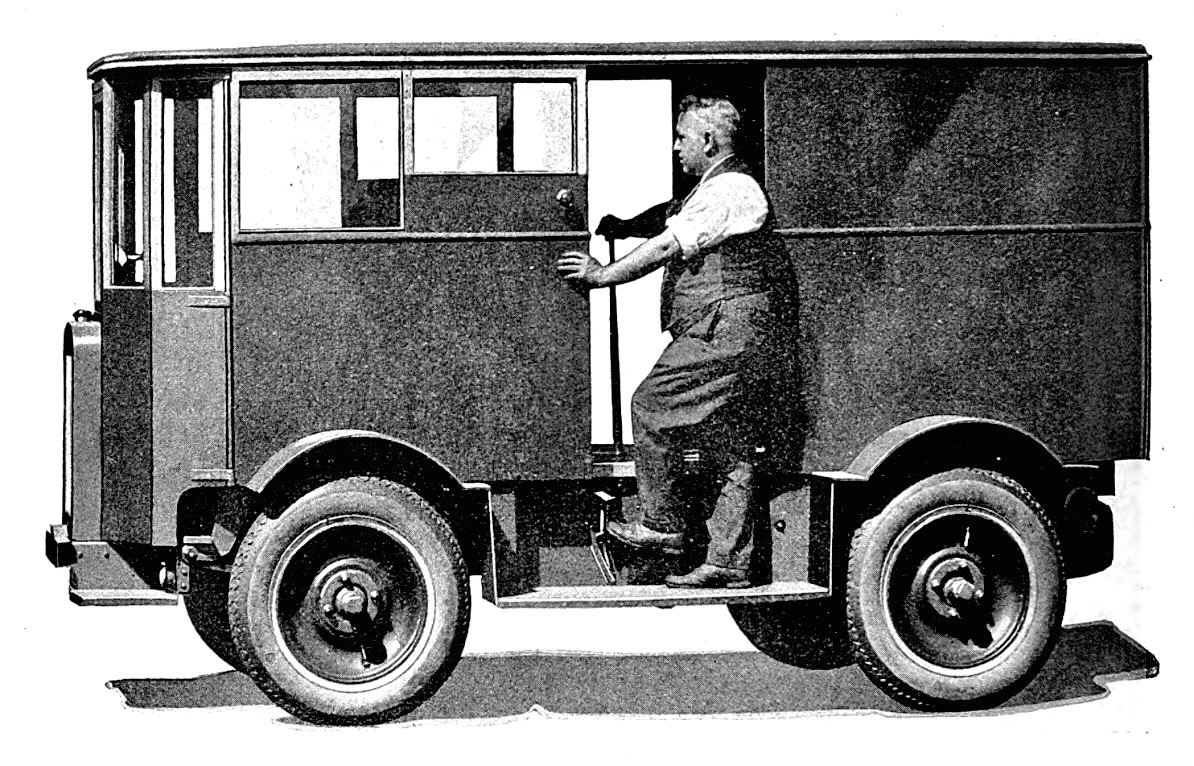
Divco Prototype (1925)

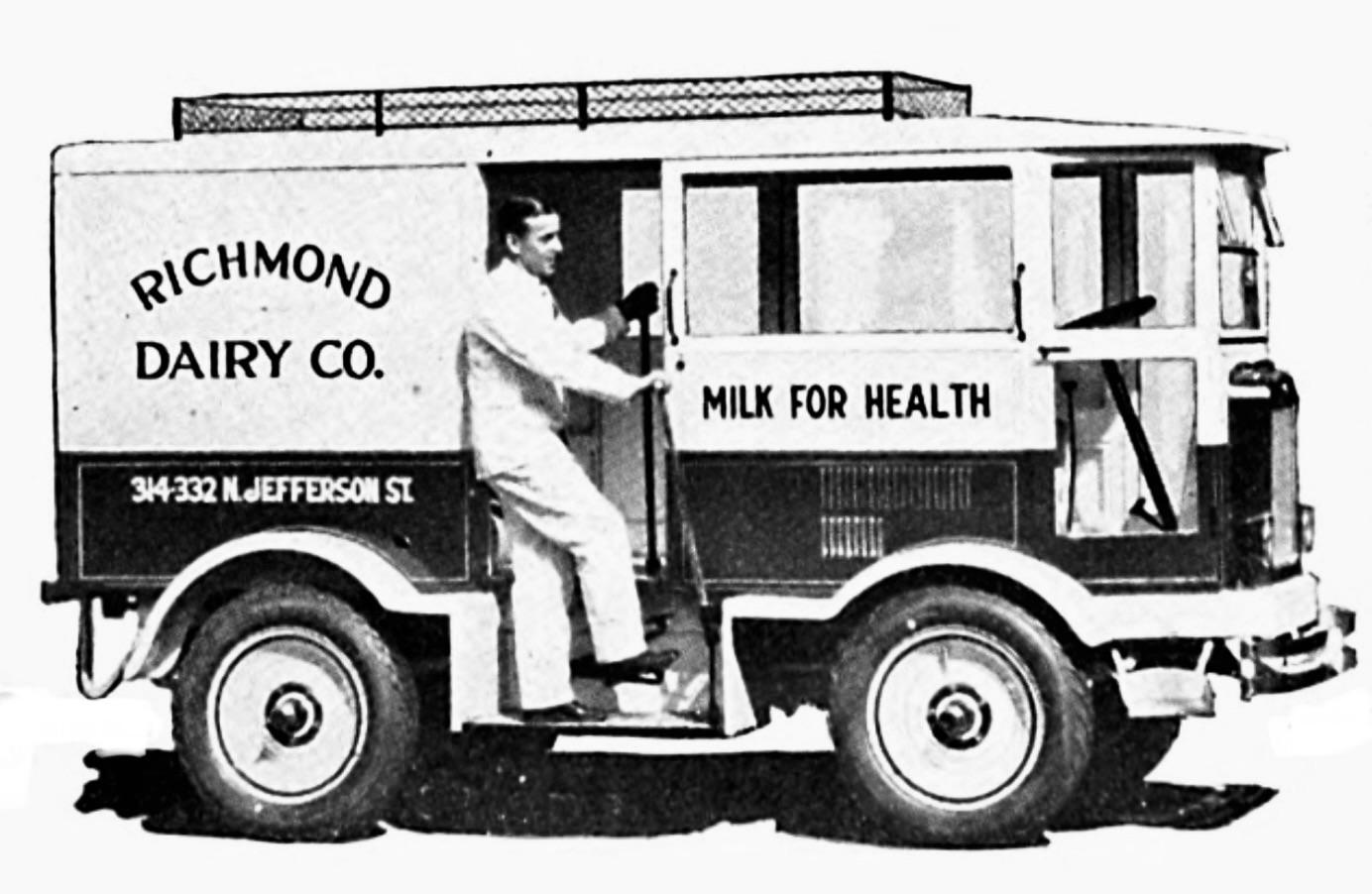
Divco (1927)

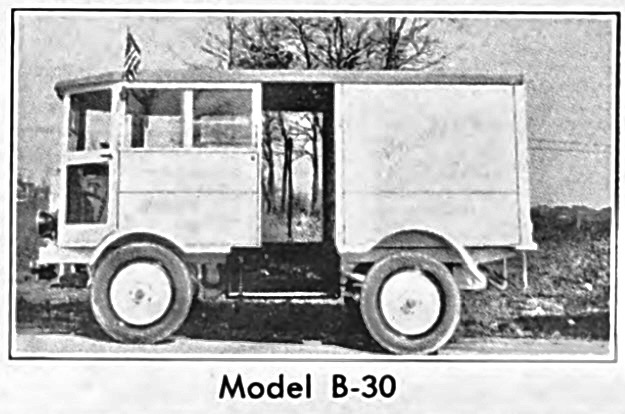
Divco Model B (1930)

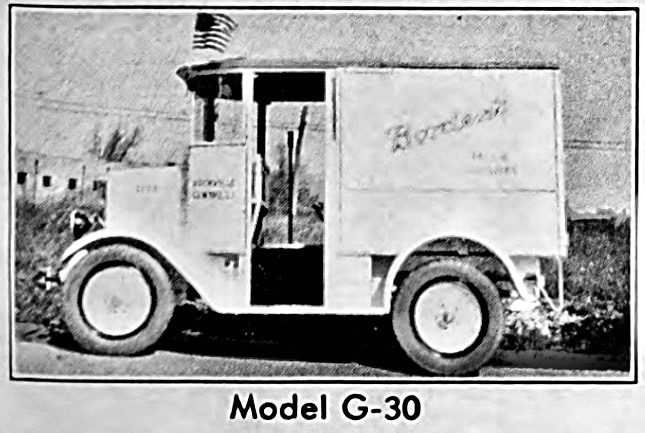
Divco Model G (1930)

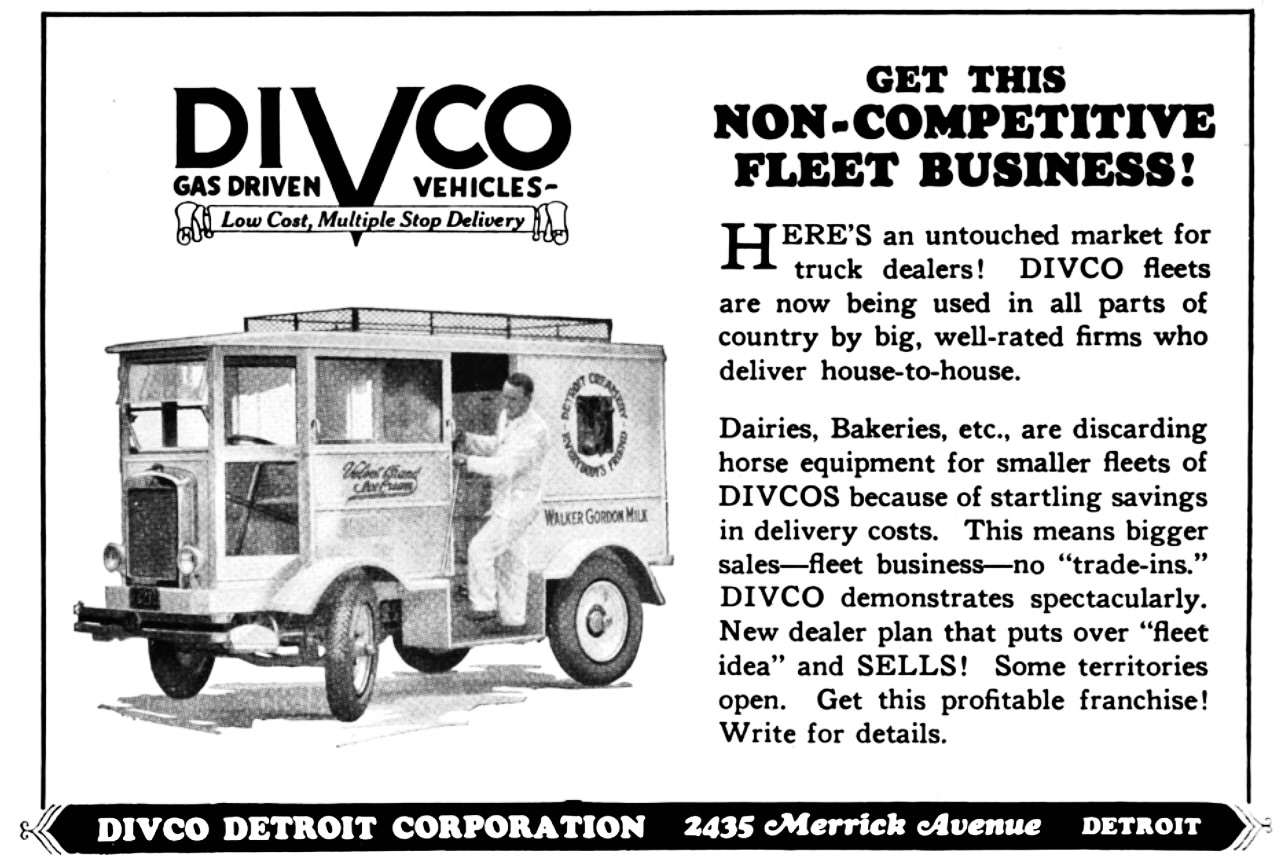
Divco advertisement (1928)

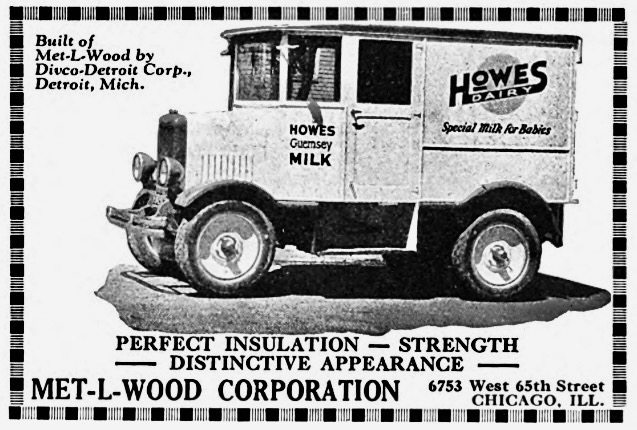
Divco advertisement (1930)

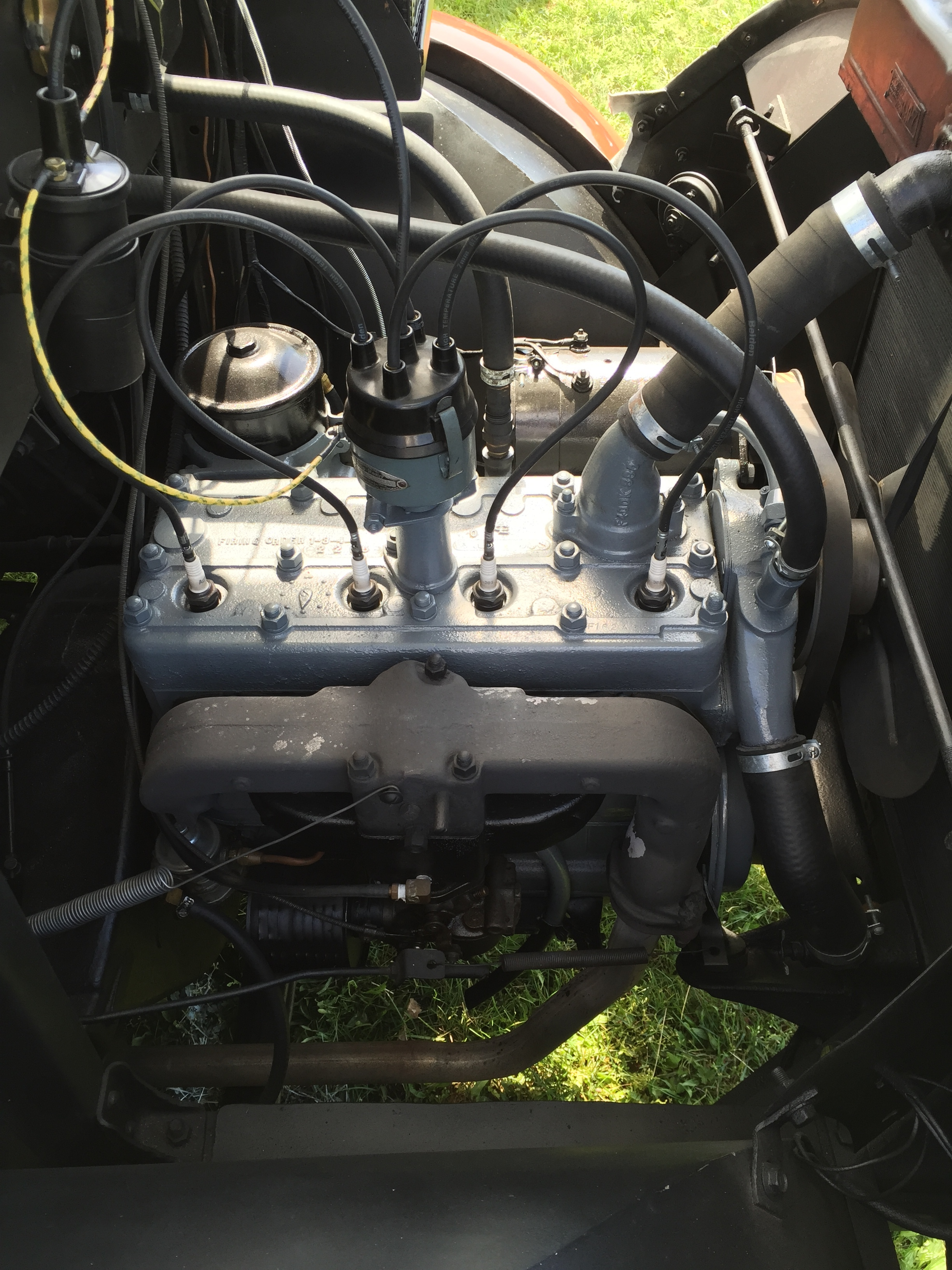
A Continental engine in a 1948 Divco delivery truck

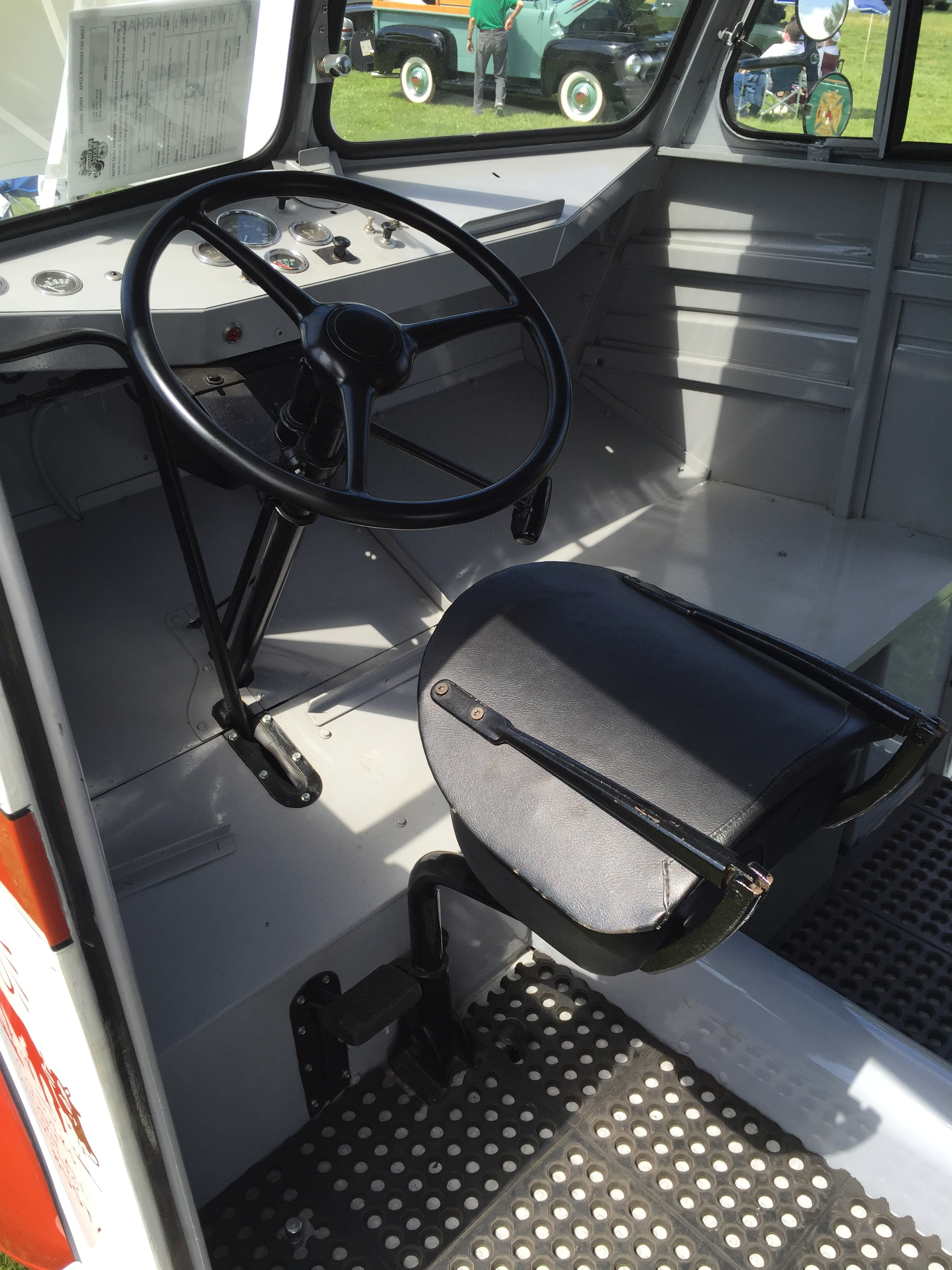
1948 Divco dashboard

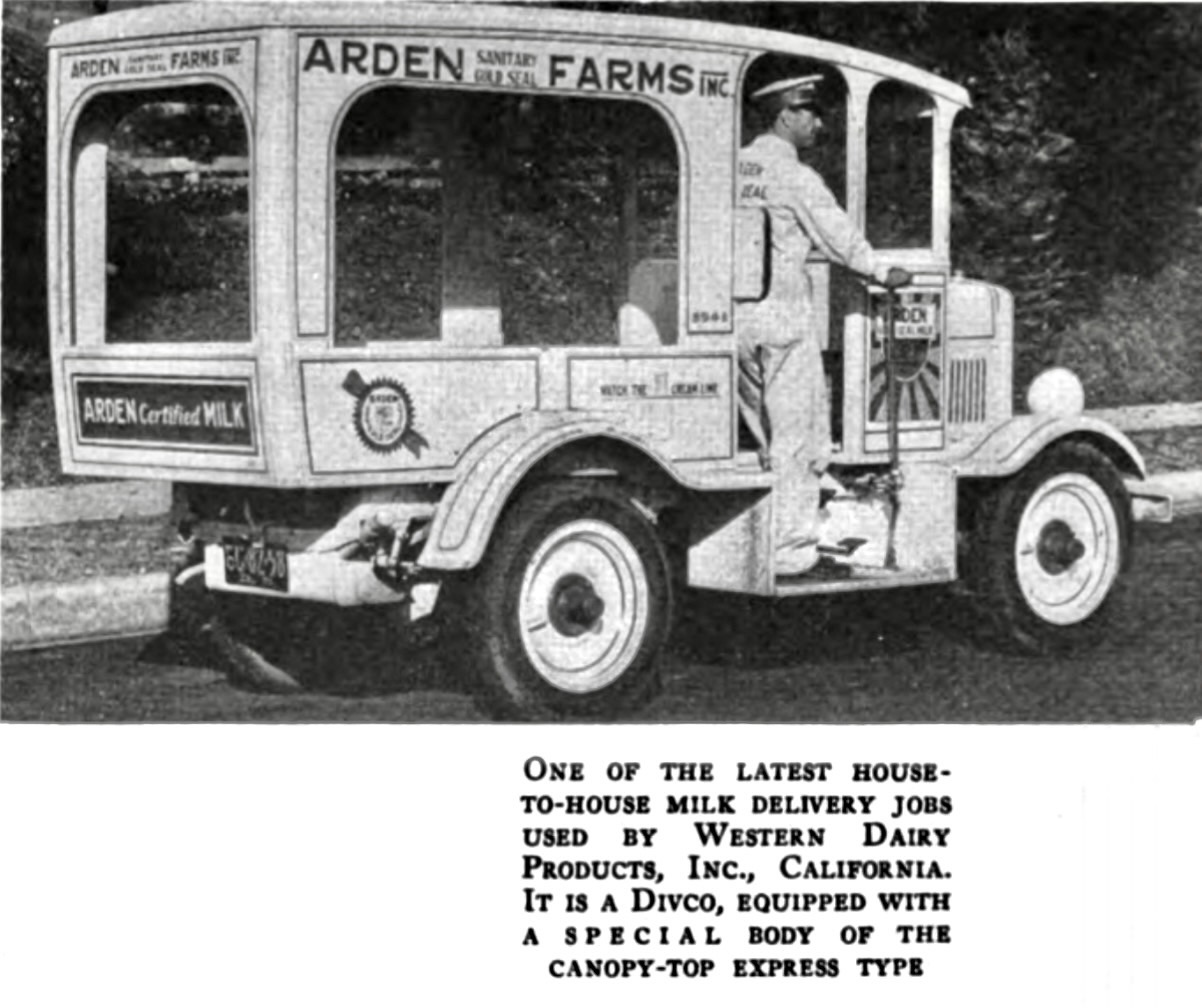
Divco (1930)

Divco was a brand name of delivery trucks built and marketed in the United States. Divco is an acronym which stands for Detroit Industrial Vehicles Company. Divco became known for its multi-stop delivery trucks, particularly in use as home delivery vehicles by dairy producers. From 1926 until 1986, Divco produced trucks of various sizes and job descriptions.

== History ==
The chief engineer of the Detroit Electric Vehicle Company, George Bacon, suggested using a gasoline engine for their line of delivery vehicles to overcome limits on their range and performance in cold weather. Because his bosses refused, Bacon left the company and with a group of investors, established the Detroit Industrial Vehicle Company in 1926.

The first Divco "Model A" were boxy, practical vehicles. High organizational costs meant the company went through a reorganization in 1927. In 1928, a larger, more conventional "Model G" was introduced that evolved into the "Model S" that was manufactured into the 1930s. During the Great Depression the company was bought out by Continental Motors Company, which supplied most of the engines installed in Divco trucks, and then spun off from Continental in 1936 to be acquired by Twin Coach, thus becoming "Divco-Twin."

A new design was introduced in 1937 featuring a welded all-steel van body and a snub-nosed hood, a model that was manufactured with almost no changes up to the end of the line in 1986. Along with the new "Model U", the company built a new production facility on the outskirts of Detroit.

With most Divco trucks, controls allowed driving while standing, including throttle and brake mounted on the steering column. The early models were not refrigerated, with perishable loads such as milk crates loaded and then covered with ice — making the trucks prone to rust from the inside out. The company marketed to fleet buyers promoting their trucks as "a bigger value when you buy, produces more profit in your delivery operation, is worth more when you trade."

In 1957, Divco merged with the Wayne Works in Richmond, Indiana, to form Divco-Wayne. During the Divco-Wayne era, some Divco trucks were modified with seats and windows from the Wayne Works to produce a Divco Dividend Bus. Very few of these units were built between 1959 and 1961. The truck manufacturing of Divco-Wayne continued to be through the Divco portion. Divco was spun off from the company in 1968, and production was moved from Detroit to Delaware, Ohio, in 1969. Production ended in 1986.

Wayne continued manufacturing buses until bankruptcy and liquidation in 1992.

Year	Production	Model
1926	~ 25	Model A
1927		
1928		Model G
		Model H
1933	203	
1934	1,070	
1935	1,661	Model S
1939		Twin Model U
1941	2,799	more than 10,376 have been produced from 1926-1941
1947	6,342	
1948	6,492	
1949	3,555	
1950	4,807	
1951	4,377	
1952	2,882	
1953	3,044	
1954	2,959	
1955	3,839	
1956	3,570	
1957	2,871	
1958	2,919	
1959	3,796	
1960	3,573	Dividend
1967	926	
1968		300, 306
1970	~ 282	
1985	~ 60	
1986		206
