= Morgan Olson =

American van manufacturing company

Morgan Olson is an American company that produces aluminum walk-in step vans. It was founded in 1946 on Long Island, New York. Previously owned by Northrop Grumman and doing business as Grumman Olson for several decades, the company was then taken over by a group of senior managers. In 2003, Grumman Olson was purchased by the American company JBPCO, which also owned Morgan Corp., the then-largest manufacturer of truck bodies in the United States. Grumman Olson was renamed Morgan Olson in 2004.

== History ==
The idea for the first all-aluminum walk-in step van was originated by Walter Heingartner, owner of Kinney Motors Chevrolet in Brooklyn, NY. Heingartner was friends with Jimmy Olson, then Commissioner of the New York State Liquor Authority. Olson had no truck experience, but knowing there were ten independent laundry companies in Brooklyn alone, he saw a market. He also knew someone who could build it, "Jake" Swirbul, one of Grumman's founders. Grumman had no experience building commercial truck bodies. However, they decided to move forward with the concept and Grumman Aircraft Engineering was scheduled to produce the vehicle beginning in 1939. The concept was shelved due to the onset of World War II.

After the war, Olson and three partners formulated the J.B.E. Olson Corporation on Coney Island Avenue in Brooklyn.

The company grew over the next few decades. The company purchased the Sturgis, MI facility, its current headquarters, in 1963.

In 1984, Grumman Olson was awarded with the largest contract in its history. The United States Postal Service (USPS) awarded Grumman Olson a contract worth over one billion dollars. As of early 2016, some 163,000 Grumman LLVs were still in operation.

After changes in ownership in the 1990s, Grumman Olson faced a declining market and eventually declared bankruptcy in 2001. In 2003, the company was purchased by JB Poindexter, Inc. (JBPCO), a parent company whose sales are over one billion annually. At that time, the company's name was changed to Morgan Olson.

Morgan Olson produces walk-in step vans, P31 delivery trucks, the C250 mail & parcel delivery truck, and cargo shelving upfittings from three manufacturing facilities. These state-of-the-art manufacturing facilities are located in Sturgis, Michigan; Loudon, Tennessee; and Ringgold, Virginia.

== Products ==
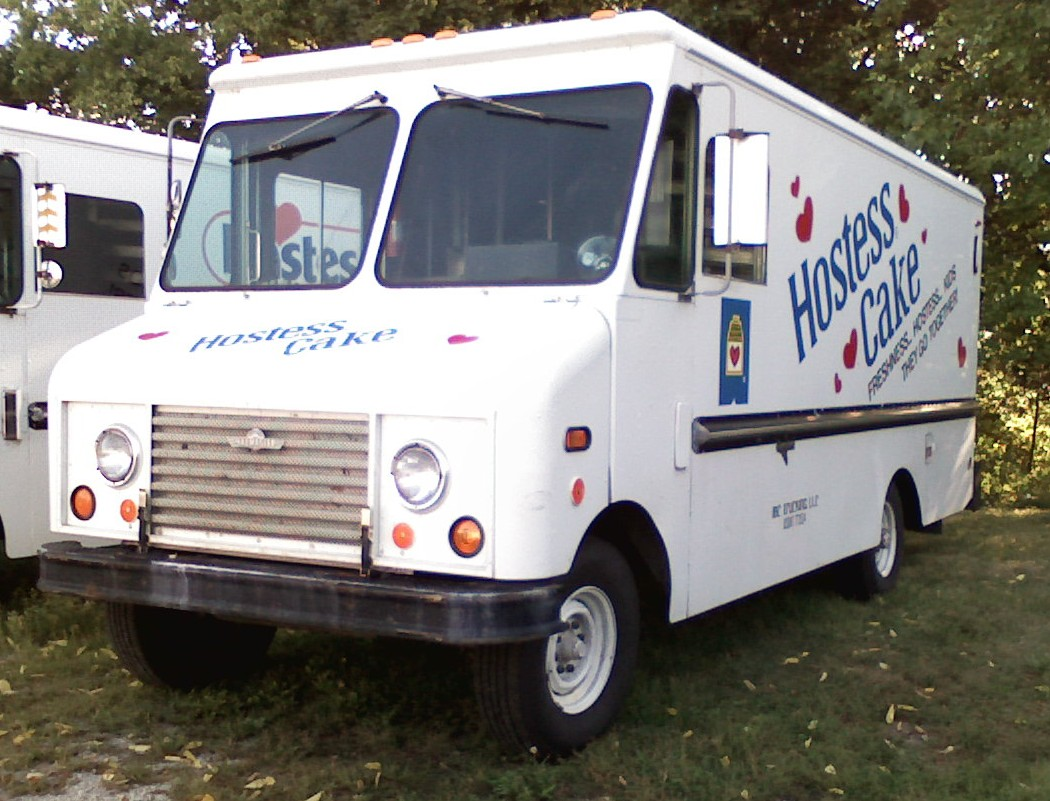
Grumman Kabmaster

- 1946-19?? Olson Kargo King
- Olson/Grumman Kurb Side
- Olson/Grumman Kurb Van
- Olson/Grumman Kurb Van King
- 195? - 1990 Olson/Grumman Kurbmaster
- Olson/Grumman Junior Kurbmaster
- 1955-196? Olson Olsonette (small, class 1)
- 1965-2001 Grumman P-500/600/800 (only sold to UPS after 1980)
- 1983-1985 Grumman Kubvan
- 1986-1994 Grumman LLV
- 1990-20?? Grumman/Morgan Olson Route Star (7,600-14,000 lb GVWR)
- 1991-?? Grumman Olson Freight Star (Van/cutaway version of Route Star
- 2023-present Morgan Olson C250 (Grumman LLV replacement for Canada Post)

== Location ==
Morgan Olson's home plant and corporate offices are located in Sturgis, Michigan. Loudon, Tennessee became home to the second production facility in 2015. The third and newest production facility, beginning operations in 2020, is located in Ringgold, Virginia.
