= Thermosmobile =

Promotional vehicles of the American Thermos Bottle Company

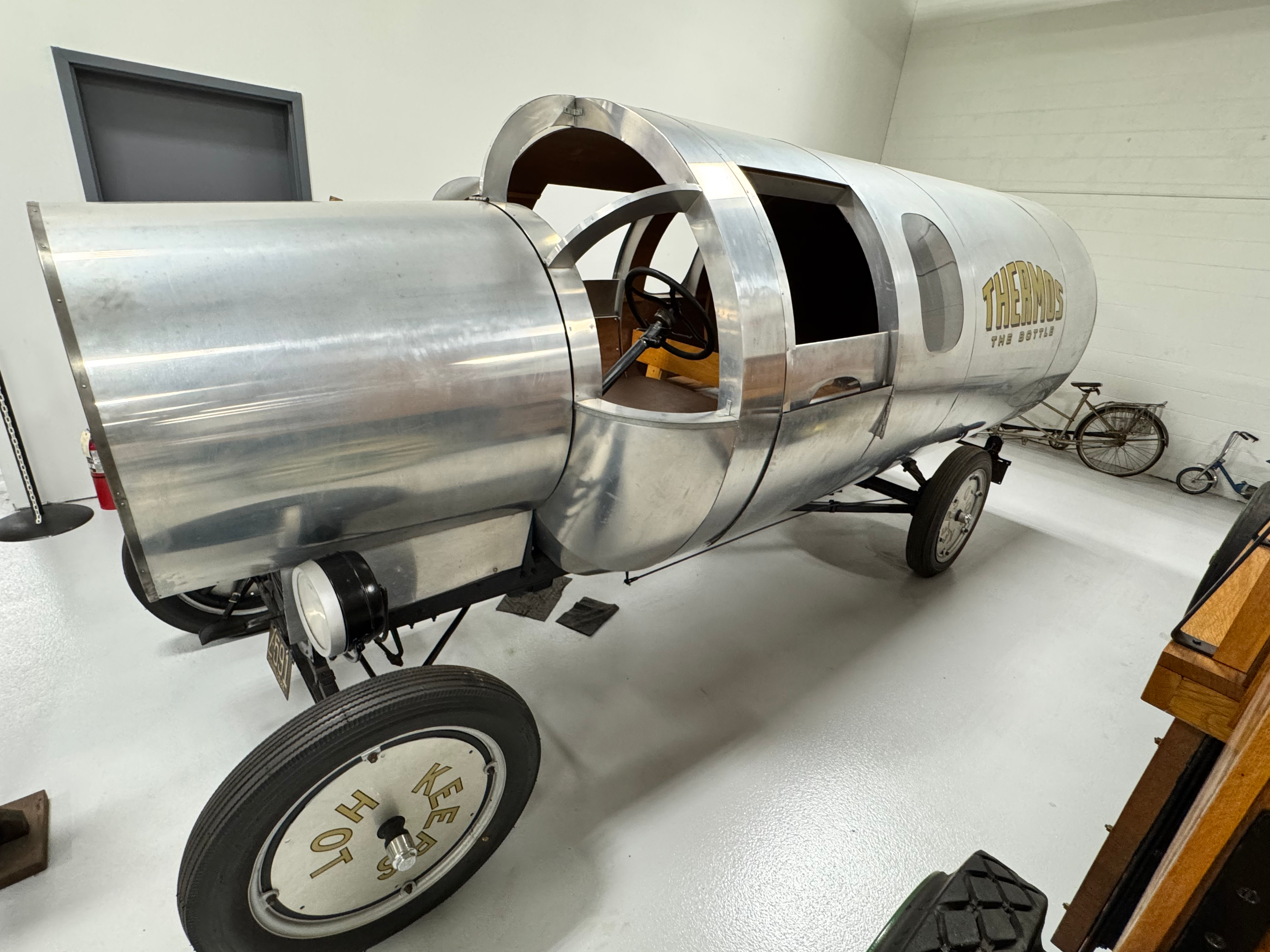
- A 1925 Thermosmobile, built on a Ford Model TT chassis

The Thermosmobile was a series of promotional vehicles shaped like a giant vacuum bottle, used by the American Thermos Bottle Company of Norwich, Connecticut, to advertise its products. It was one of the earliest brandmobiles.

== History ==
A "Thermos the Bottle" truck appeared at the 1909 Vanderbilt Cup race on Long Island, alongside other promotional vehicles, nearly three decades before Oscar Mayer introduced the Wienermobile in 1936. The company used Thermosmobiles at political, sporting and other public events to promote its vacuum bottles from 1913 to 1925. Later examples were built on the Ford Model TT truck chassis.

== Surviving examples ==
In 2007, a 1925 Thermosmobile built on a Model TT chassis went on display at the Golden Age of Trucking Museum in Middlebury, Connecticut, where it was scheduled to remain until June 2008. The museum announced in 2010 that it would close because of financial difficulties, and its building has since stood vacant. A second surviving Thermosmobile is reportedly displayed at the Keystone Truck and Tractor Museum in Colonial Heights, Virginia.

== See also ==
- Brandmobile
- Wienermobile
