= Nutmobile =

Peanut-shaped automobiles promoting Planters

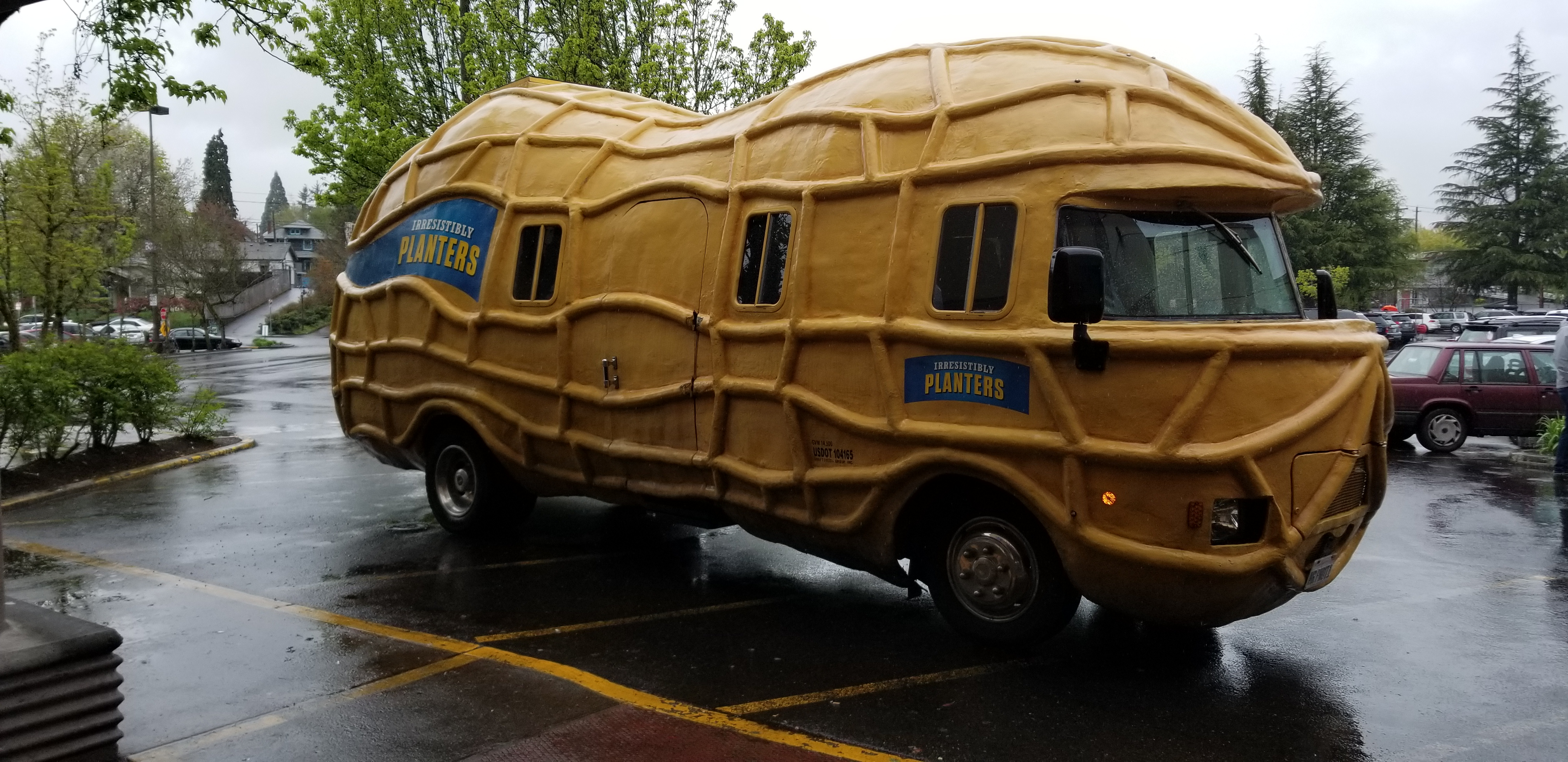
The Planters Nutmobile at a Fred Meyer.

The Nutmobile (stylized as NUTmobile) is a series of brandmobiles shaped like a peanut, owned by Hormel Foods, which are used to promote and advertise Planters products in the United States. The first version was created in 1935. Its drivers are known as "Peanutters". Each year, three Peanutters are selected to drive the Nutmobile across the country. These brand representatives are typically recent college graduates with degrees in fields such as advertising, marketing, public relations and communications.

== History ==
The first peanut-shaped car was built in 1935 for a Planters salesman. In 1999, a 25-foot (8 m) "Mr. Peanut Hot Rod" toured more than 35 cities.

In 2011, Planters introduced a Nutmobile that ran on biodiesel and carried solar panels and a wind turbine. It was built from a food truck. In 2014, two more fiberglass Nutmobiles were added, expanding the fleet to three, each driven by its own team of Peanutters. As of 2018, the touring Nutmobile was a converted 2014 Isuzu. In 2019, Planters built a new Nutmobile for its first Super Bowl commercial; it replaced the 2011 vehicle on the national tour. In 2021, the older models were retired from full-time touring and repurposed for special projects.

In June 2023, Planters announced it was renaming the Nutmobile the "Shell on Wheels".

In June 2025, Planters celebrated the program's 90th anniversary by unveiling an updated Nutmobile. The updated vehicle features a peanut-shaped door handle, a neon-lit selfie station, and a 360-degree exterior camera. Three new Peanutters were selected to drive the new model on a year-long nationwide tour.

== Peanutters ==
During their year on the road, Peanutters hand out peanut samples, Mr. Peanut memorabilia and other Planters products. The program is based in Austin, Minnesota, where new Peanutters complete two weeks of training, known as "Peanut Prep", covering how to speak for the brand, Planters history and how to drive the vehicles. Mr. Peanut accompanies the Peanutters to events, posing for photos, signing autographs and greeting visitors.

The University of Illinois Urbana-Champaign has supplied Peanutters for several tours, including 2014–15, 2016–17, 2018–19 and 2019–20.

== See also ==
- Wienermobile
- Bootmobile
