= Brandmobile =

Promotional vehicle in the shape of a commercial product

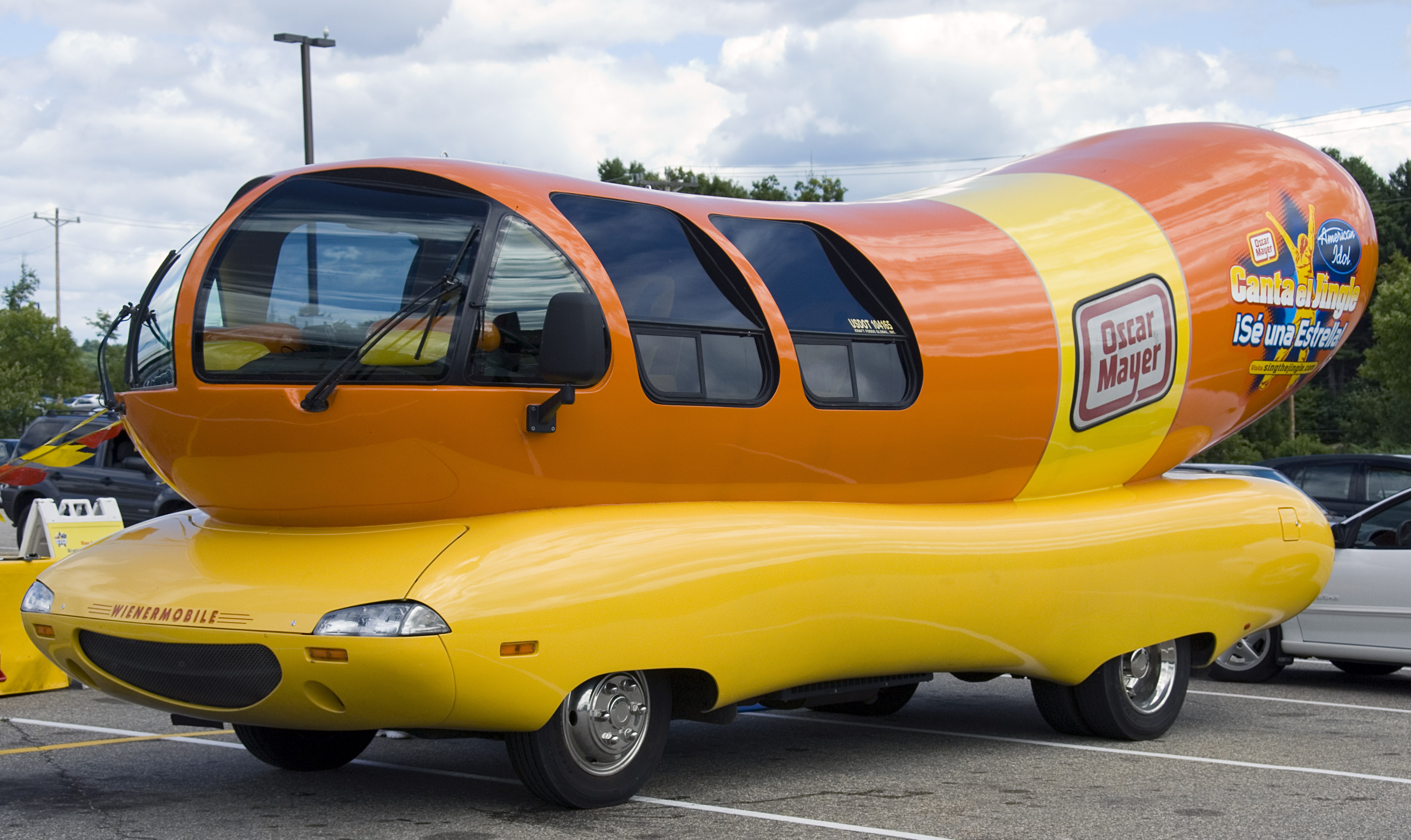
An Oscar Mayer Wienermobile "Bologna" in Gilford, New Hampshire, 2007

A brandmobile is a motorized vehicle customized to resemble a consumer product as a promotional tool for advertising and marketing. These vehicles range from altered consumer automobiles and vans to larger purpose-built buses and trucks, transformed into eye-catching, mobile advertisements designed to capture public attention. Brandmobiles are often used with public relations events, leveraging their mobility to reach a wider audience than stationary advertising mediums.

Brandmobiles date back to at least the 1930s: Planters built its first Nutmobile in 1935, and Oscar Mayer introduced the Wienermobile in 1936. The concept grew out of traditional vehicle advertising and builds on the tradition of novelty architecture.

Brandmobile campaigns can face challenges such as logistics, regulatory restrictions on vehicle advertising, and concerns over emissions from gasoline-powered vehicles.

== Examples ==
Well-known brandmobiles include:

- Wienermobile by Oscar Mayer, briefly renamed the Frankmobile in 2023
- Nutmobile by Planters
- Bootmobile by L.L.Bean
- Thermosmobile by the American Thermos Bottle
- Red Bull Mobile, a Mini Cooper or Volkswagen Beetle carrying an oversized drink can
- Kissmobile by Hershey's, carrying three giant Kisses
- Cadbury Creme Egg Car
- Midwest Dairy Association Cheese Car
- Outspan Orange car, six of which were built on Mini components between 1972 and 1974
- Peepsmobile by Just Born, a giant Peep on a Volkswagen Beetle
- Goldfish Mobile by Pepperidge Farm
- Big Idaho Potato Truck, carrying a giant fiberglass-and-steel potato
- Voxmobile, built by George Barris in 1967 for Vox
- Zippo Car, a 1947 Chrysler Saratoga topped with giant lighters

=== Tour de France ===
Since the 1930s, the Tour de France road cycling race has hosted la caravane publicitaire (publicity caravan) of advertising trucks that precede the day's cyclists to entertain the crowds lining the streets and handing out free merchandise. Many of these are brandmobiles, resembling the product of the companies, and have become a popular attraction of the yearly race. Created by Tour founder Henri Desgrange, the caravan had about 170 vehicles in 2017; according to the official Tour website, 47% of spectators came primarily to see it. Notable brands include Haribo, Vittel, and Le Gaulois poultry products.

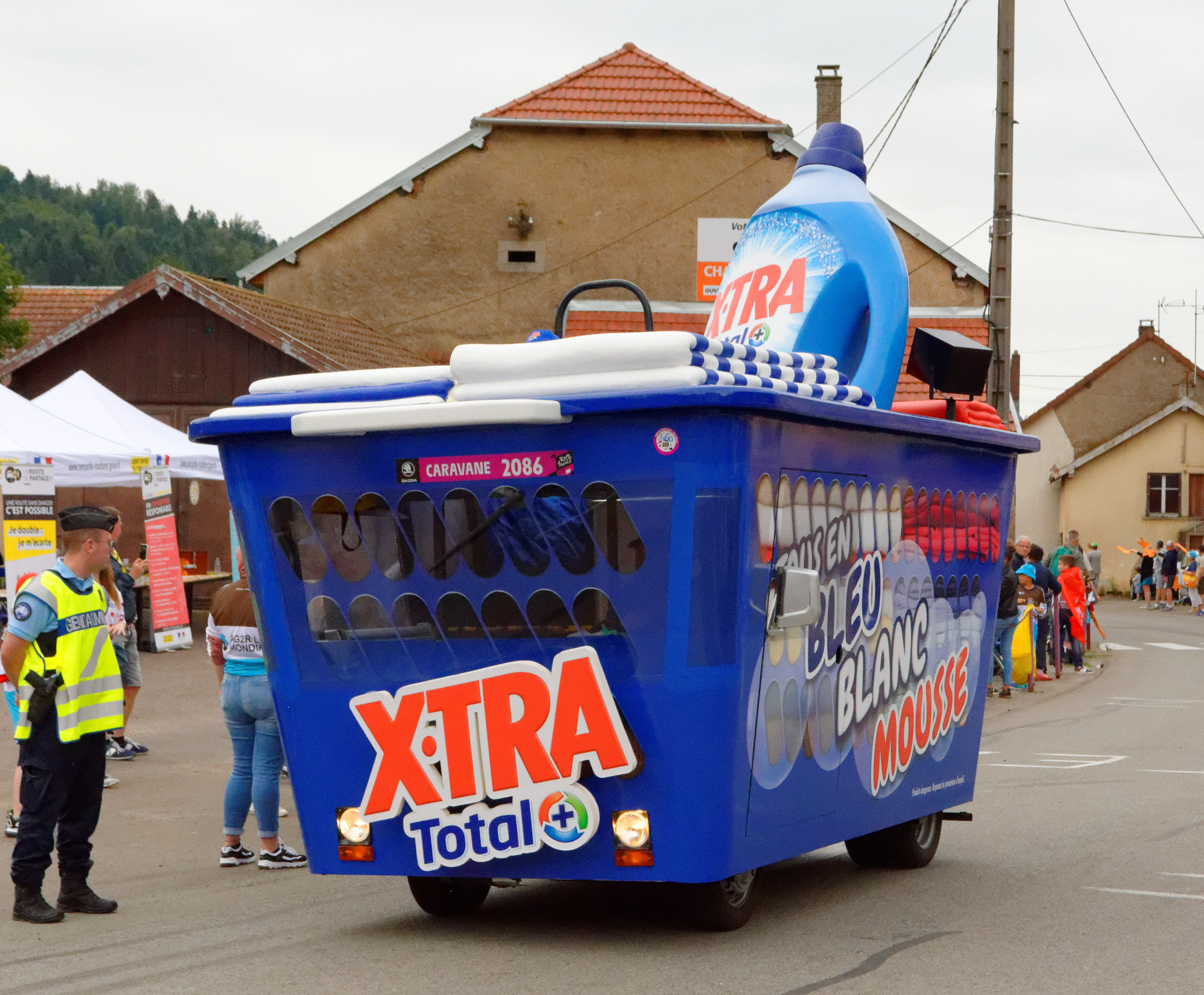
X•TRA, 2019

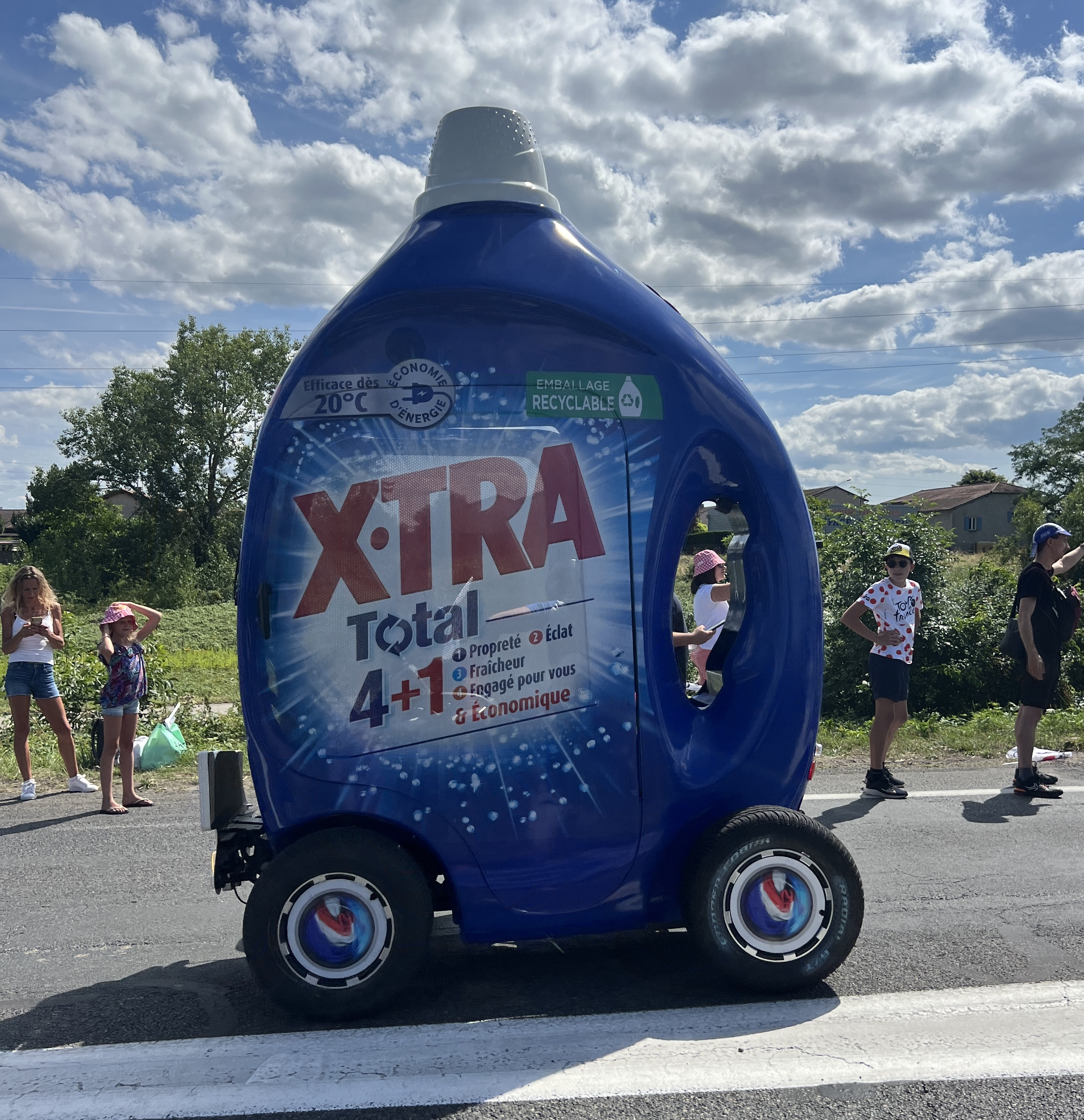
X•TRA, 2023

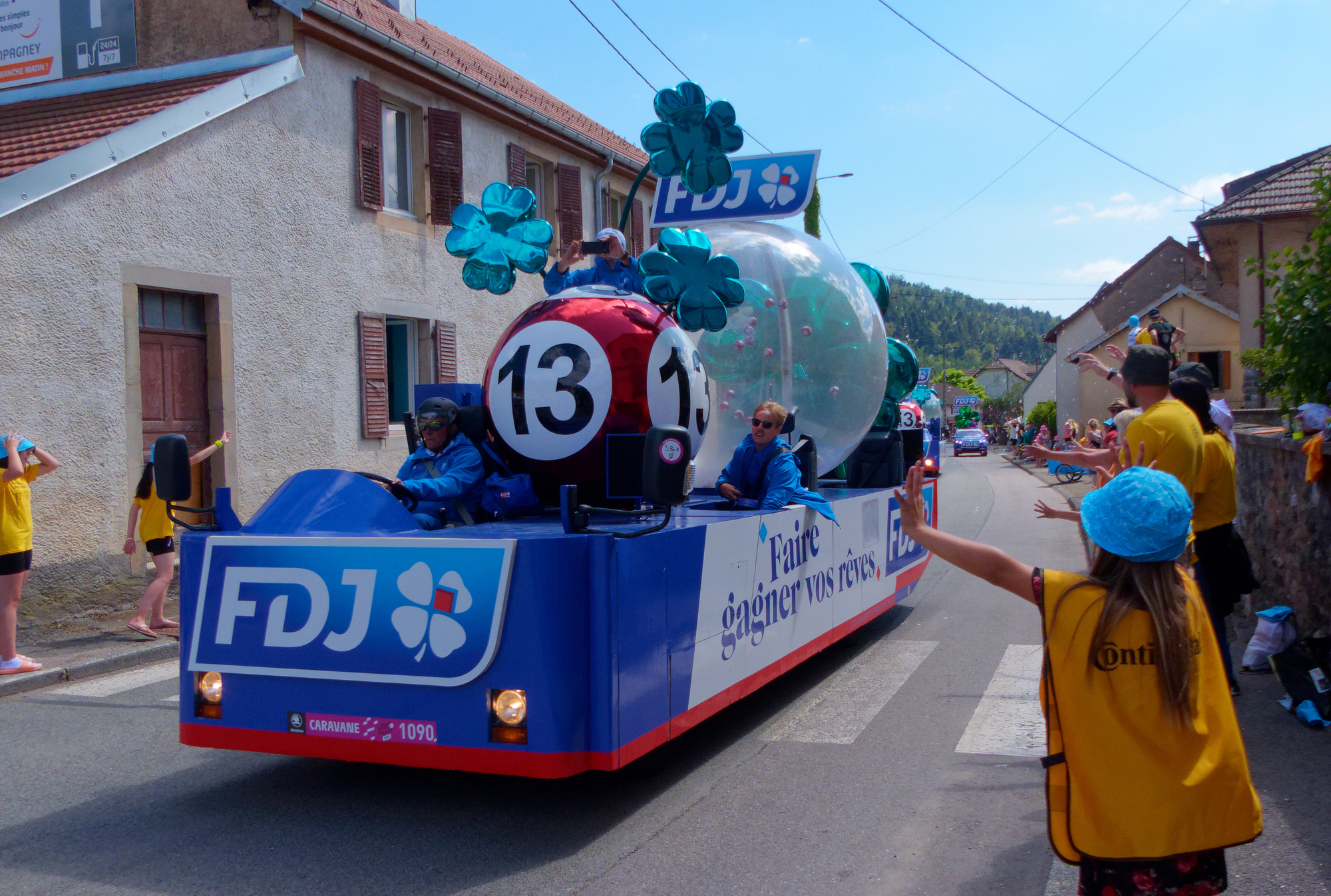
Française des Jeux lottery trucks, 2022

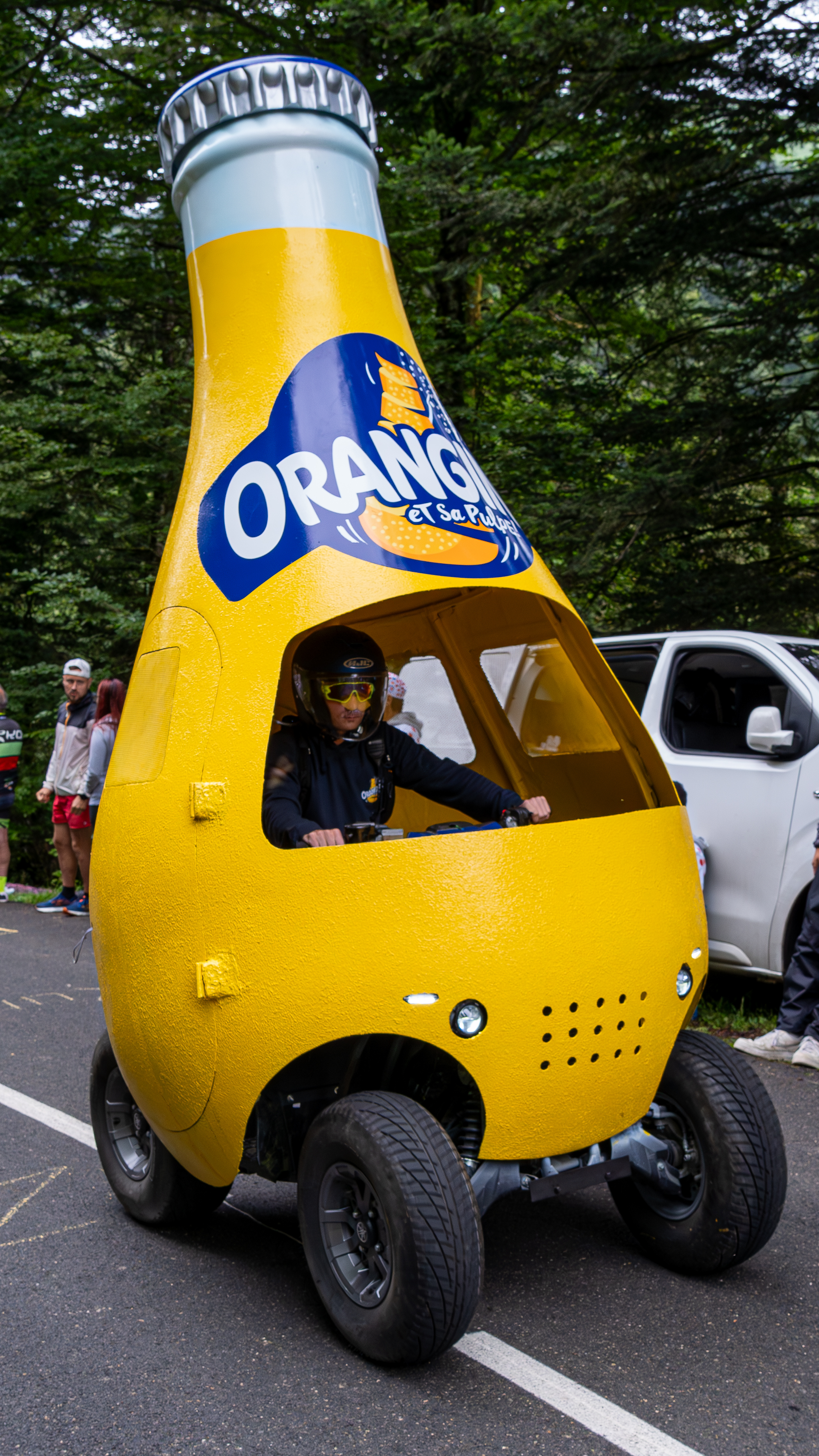
Orangina, 2023

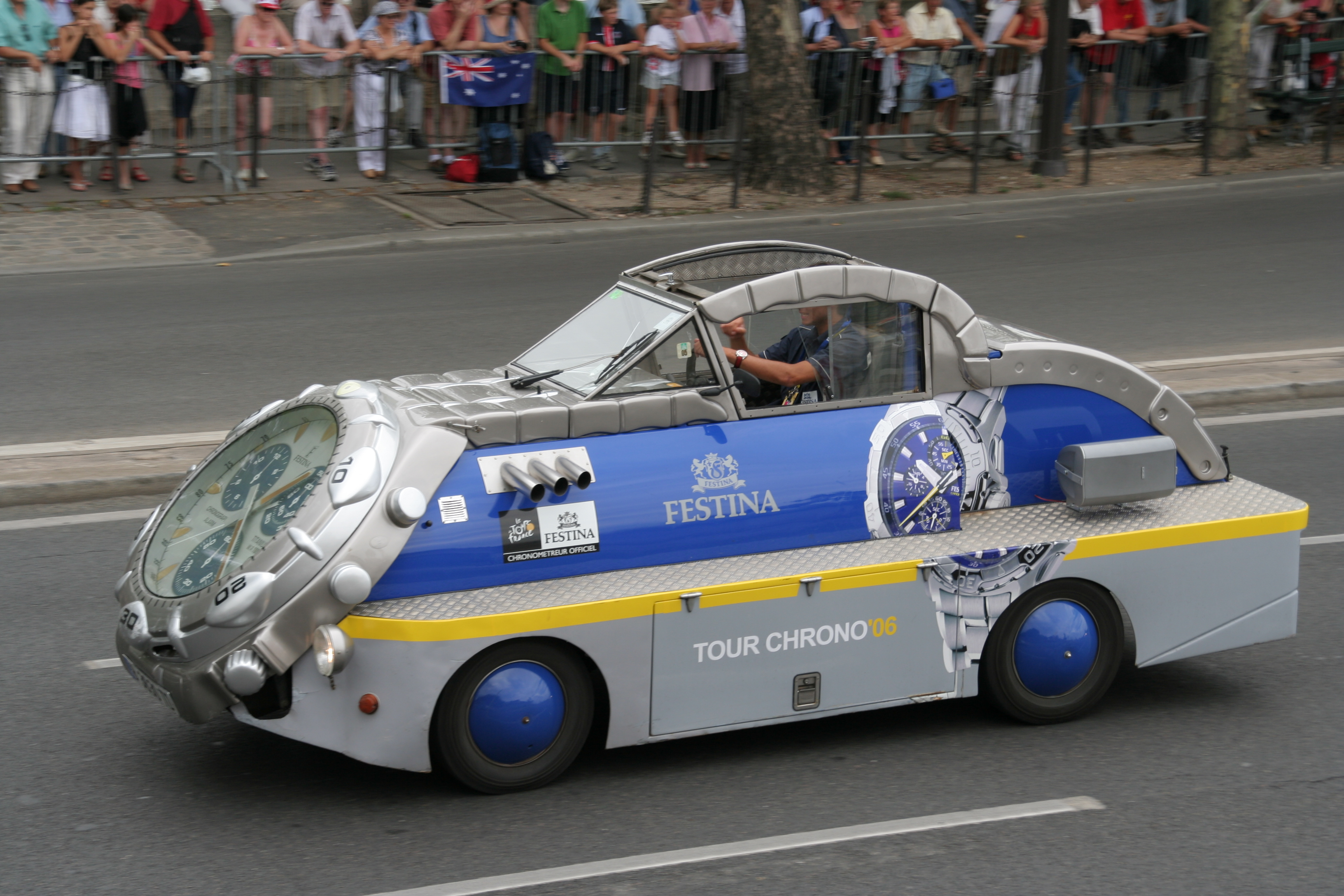
Festina watches, 2006

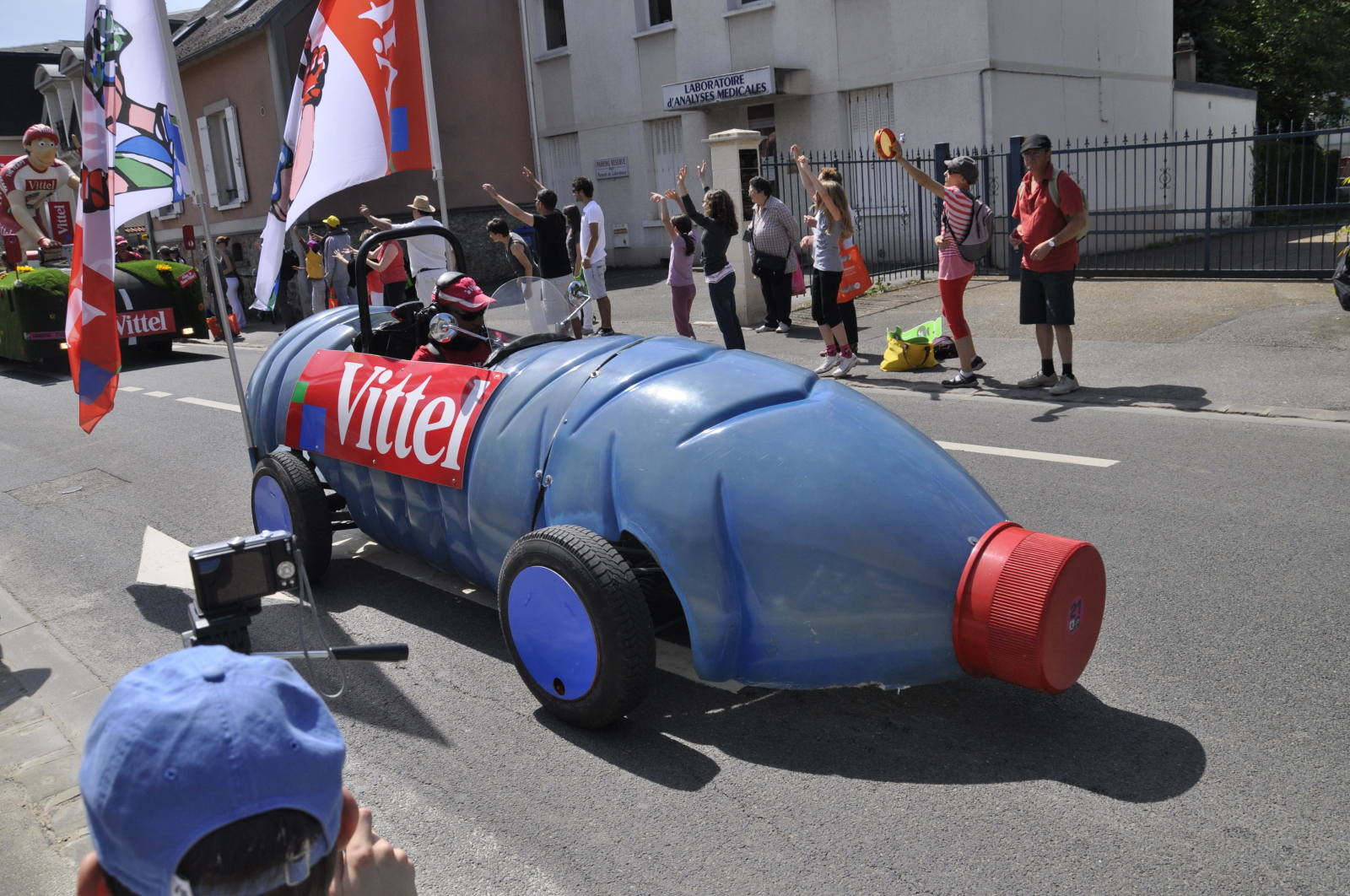
Vittel, 2012

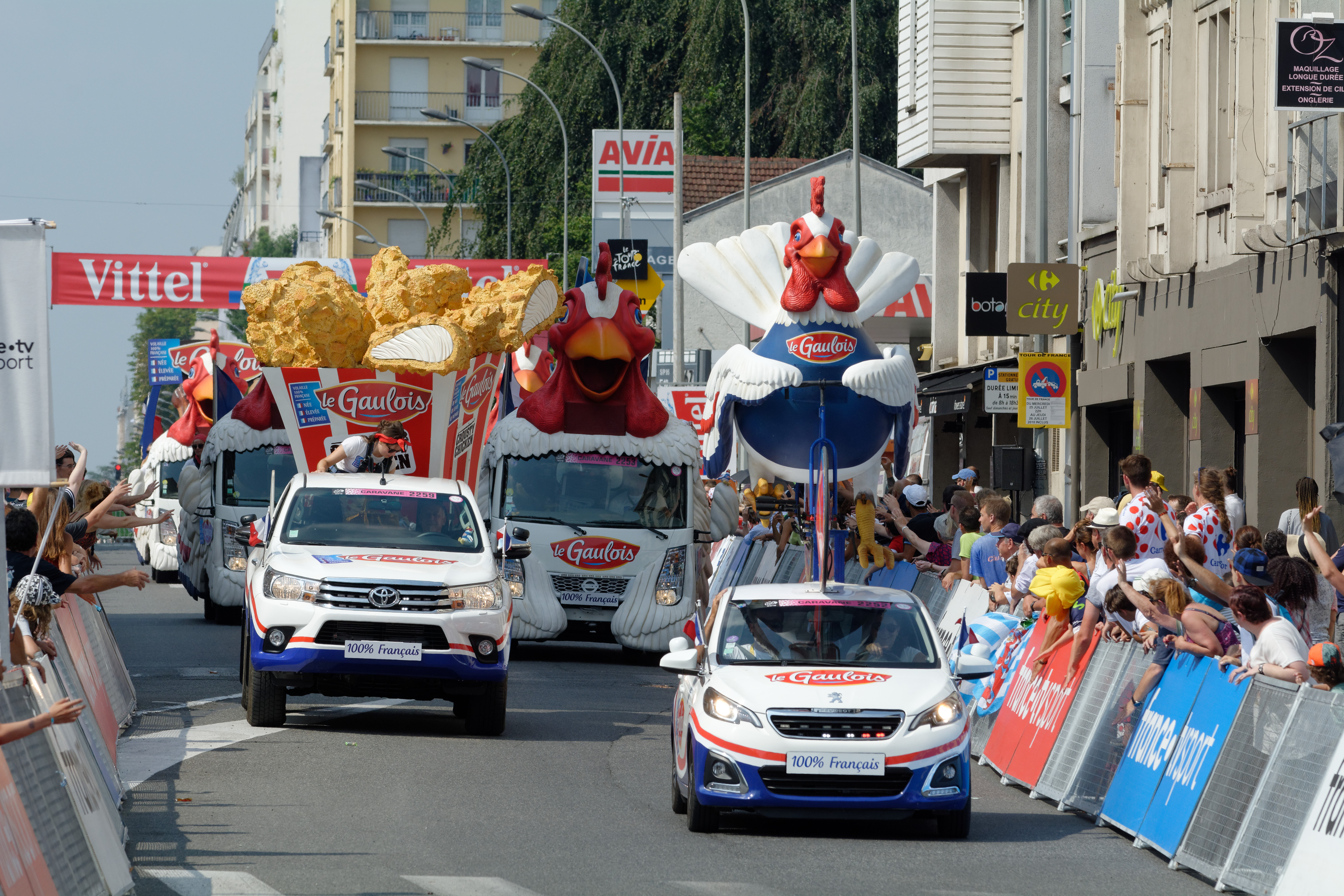
Le Gaulois poultry product trucks, 2018

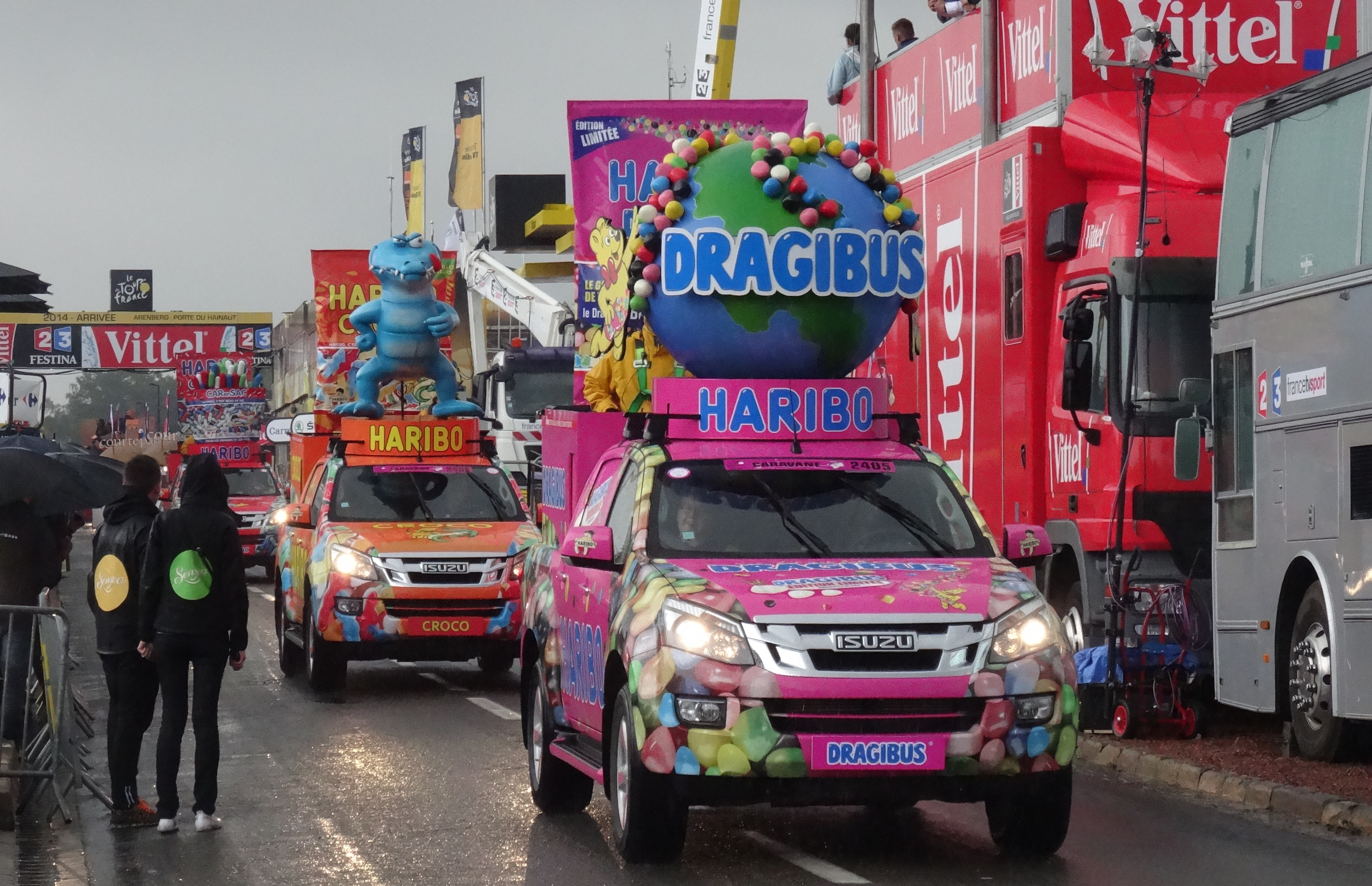
Haribo trucks, 2014

== Gallery ==
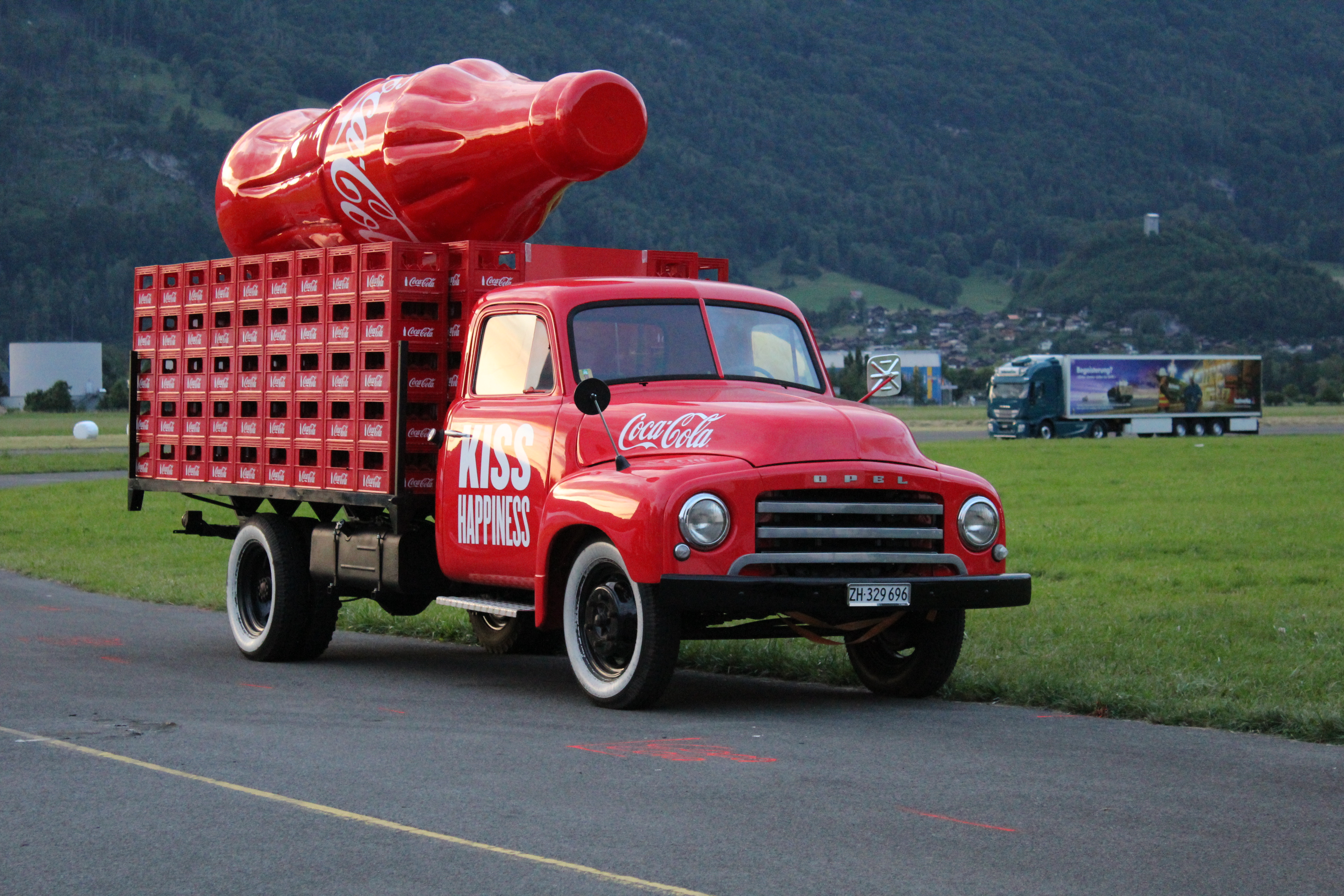
Coca-Cola pickup

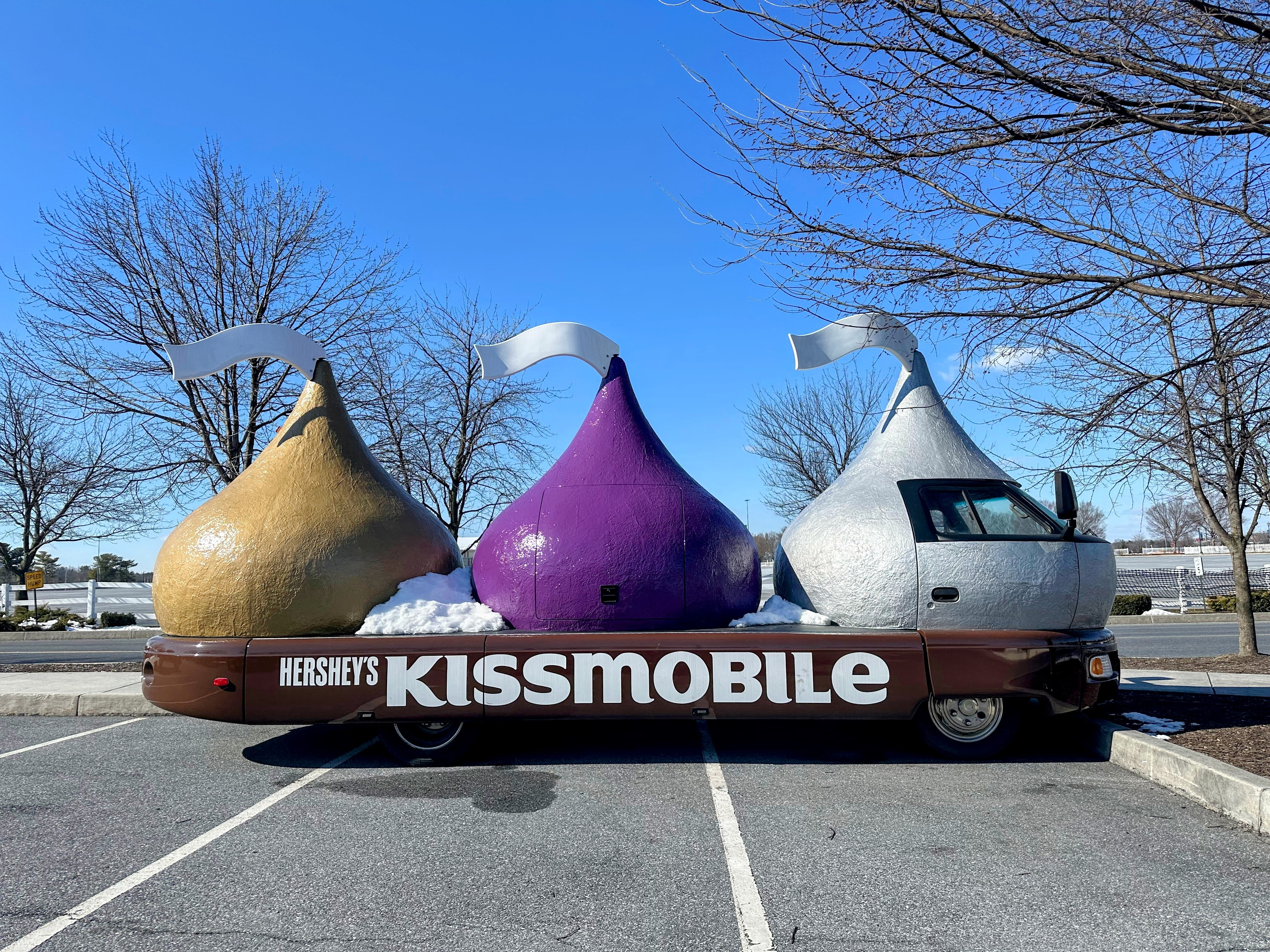
Hershey Kissmobile in Hersheypark, Pennsylvania, 2024

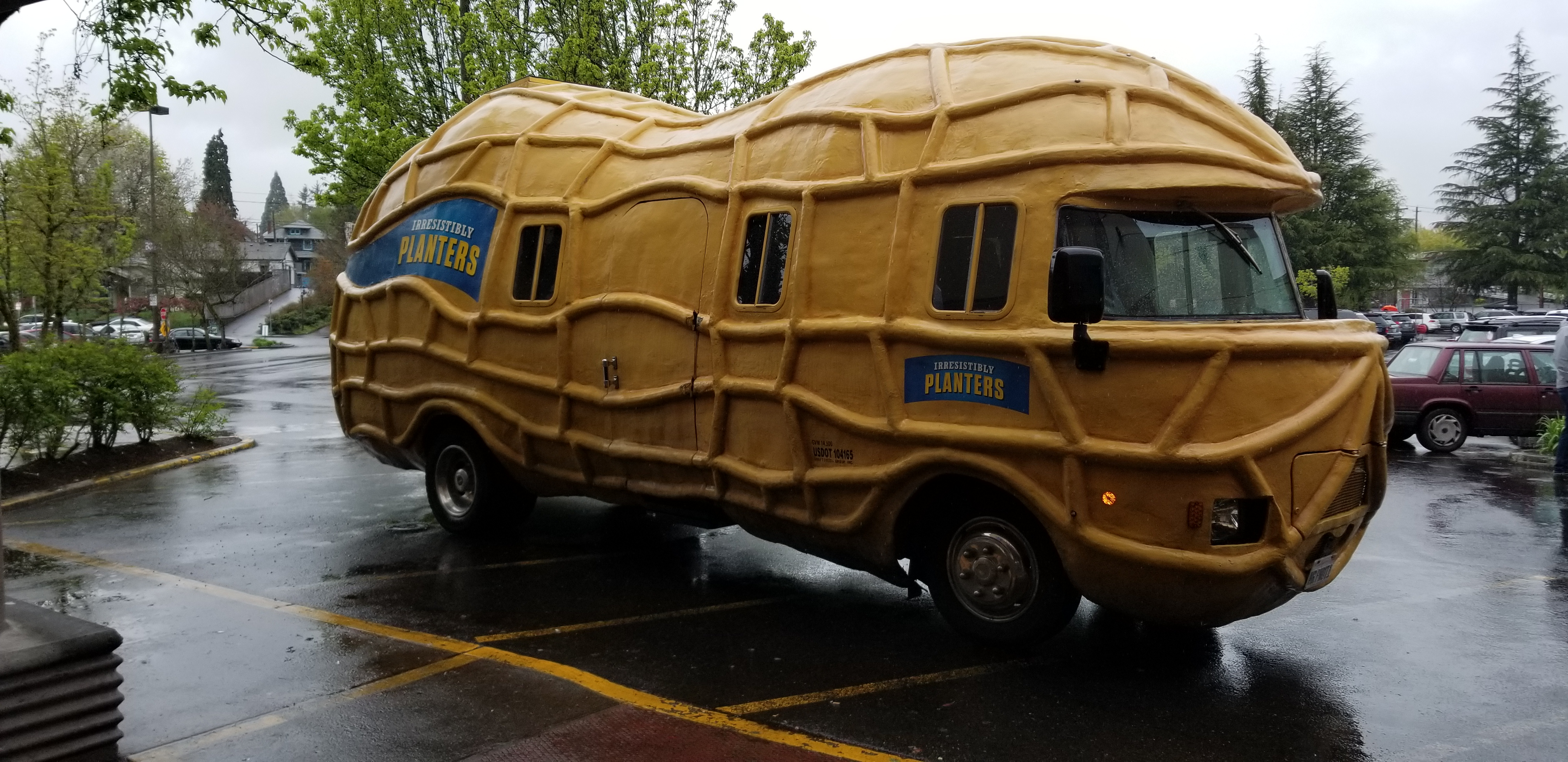
Nutmobile in Portland, Oregon, 2018

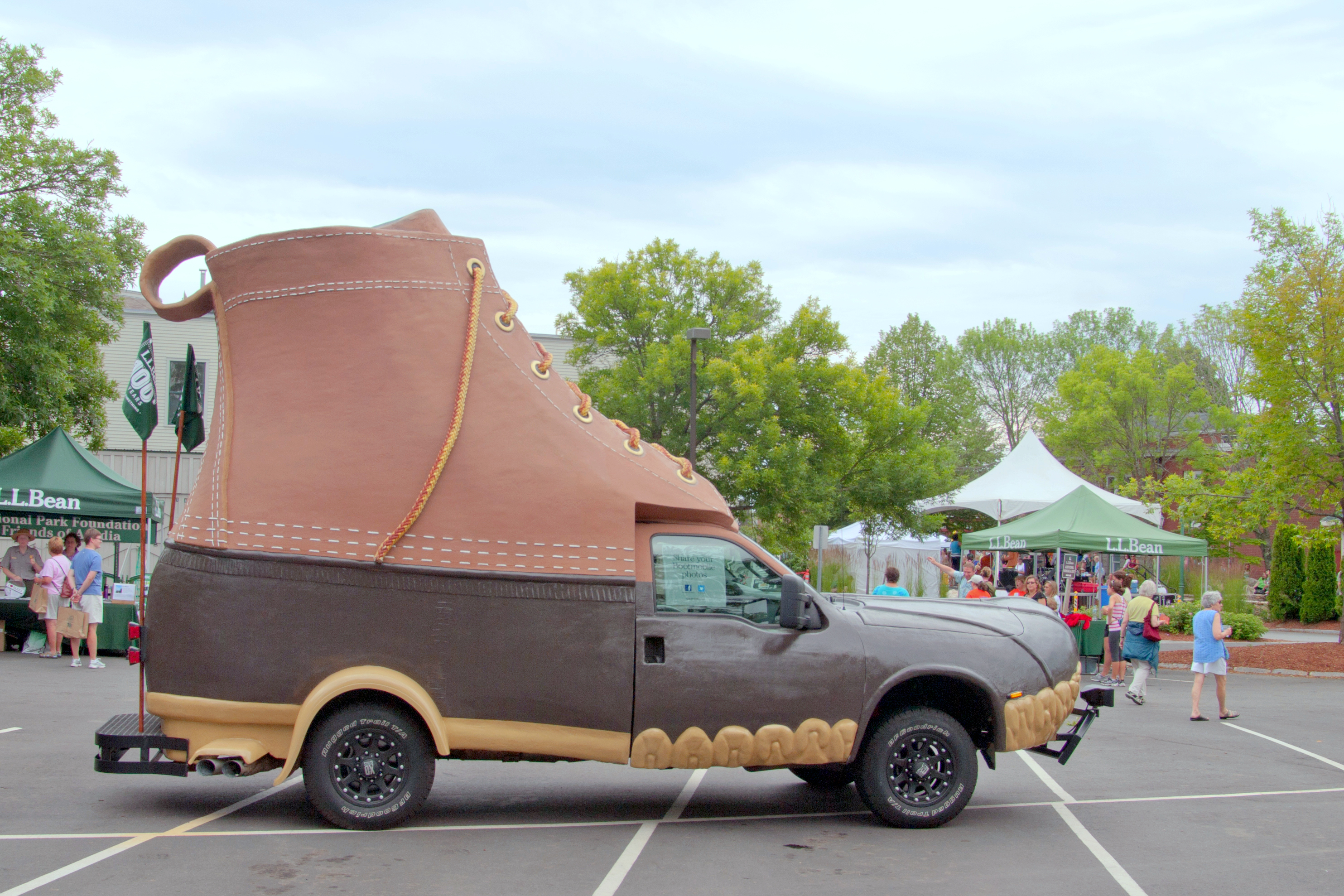
L.L.Bean Bootmobile in Freeport, Maine, 2012

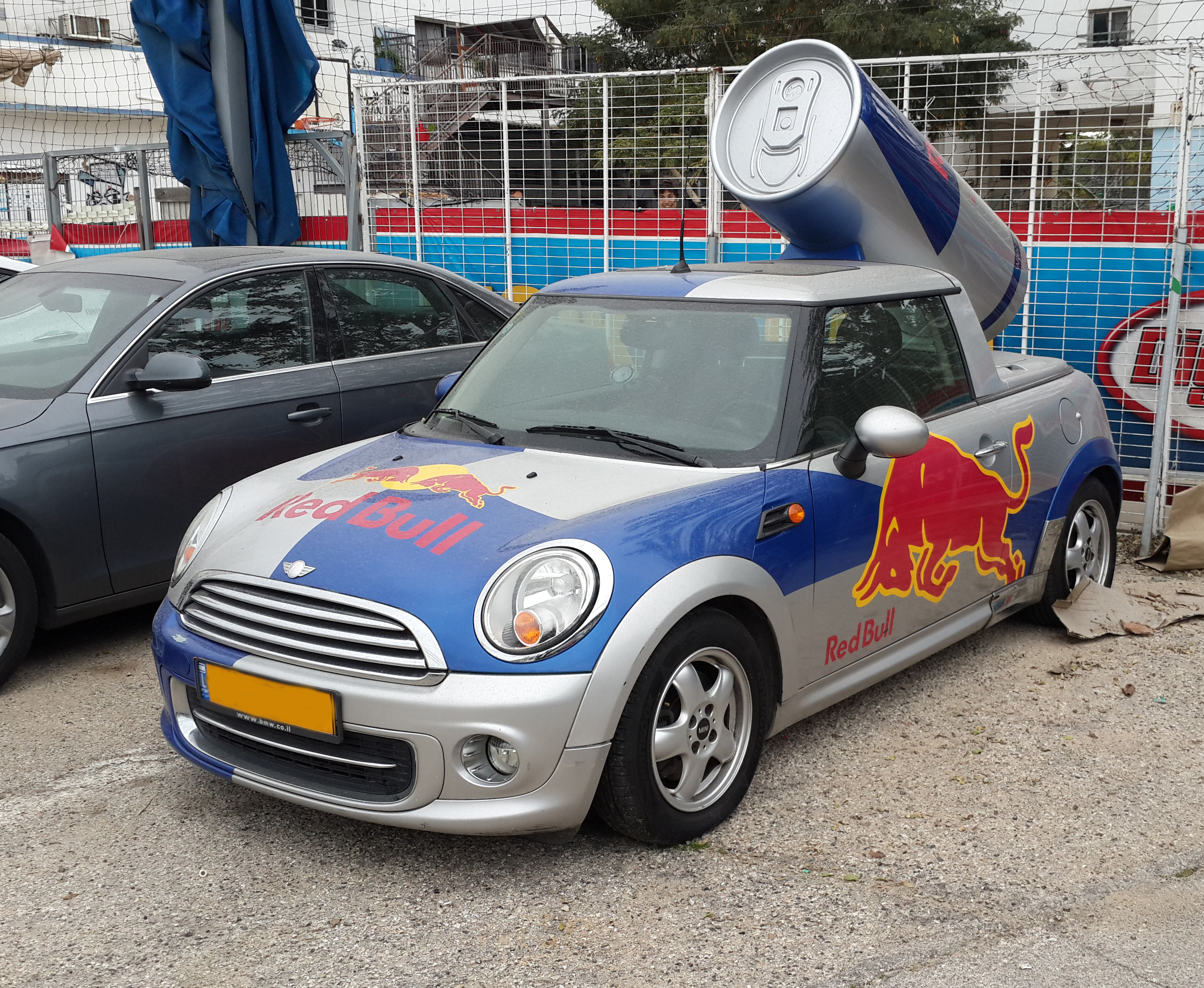
Red Bull car in Israel, 2017

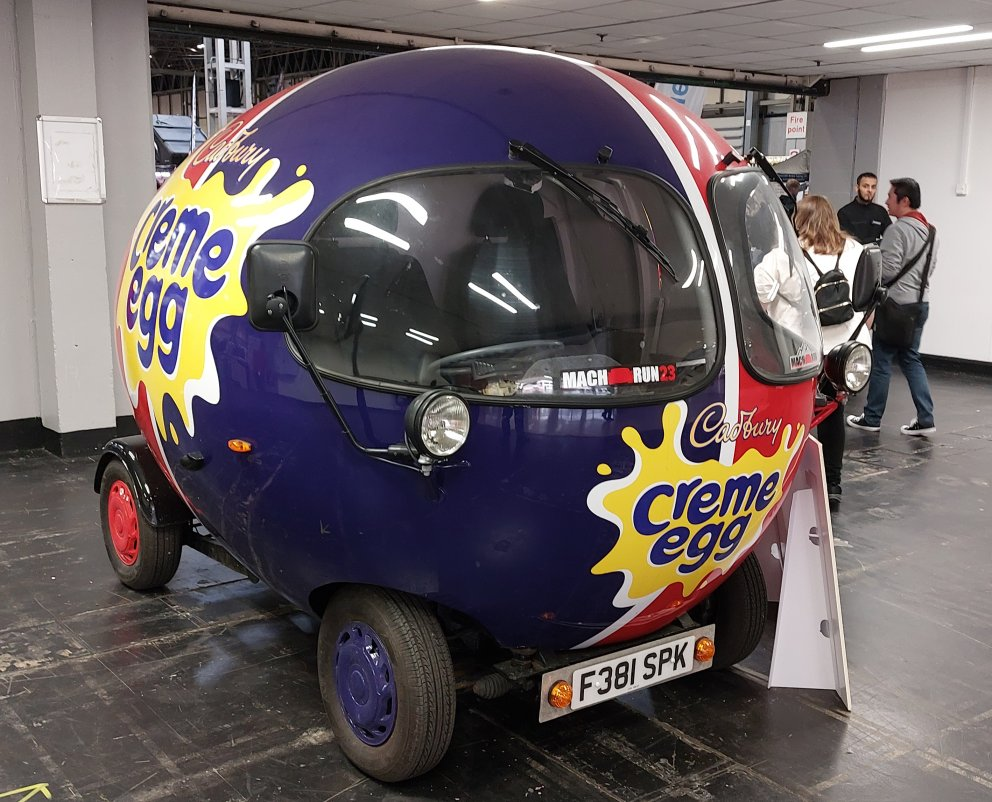
Cadbury Creme Egg Car, 2024

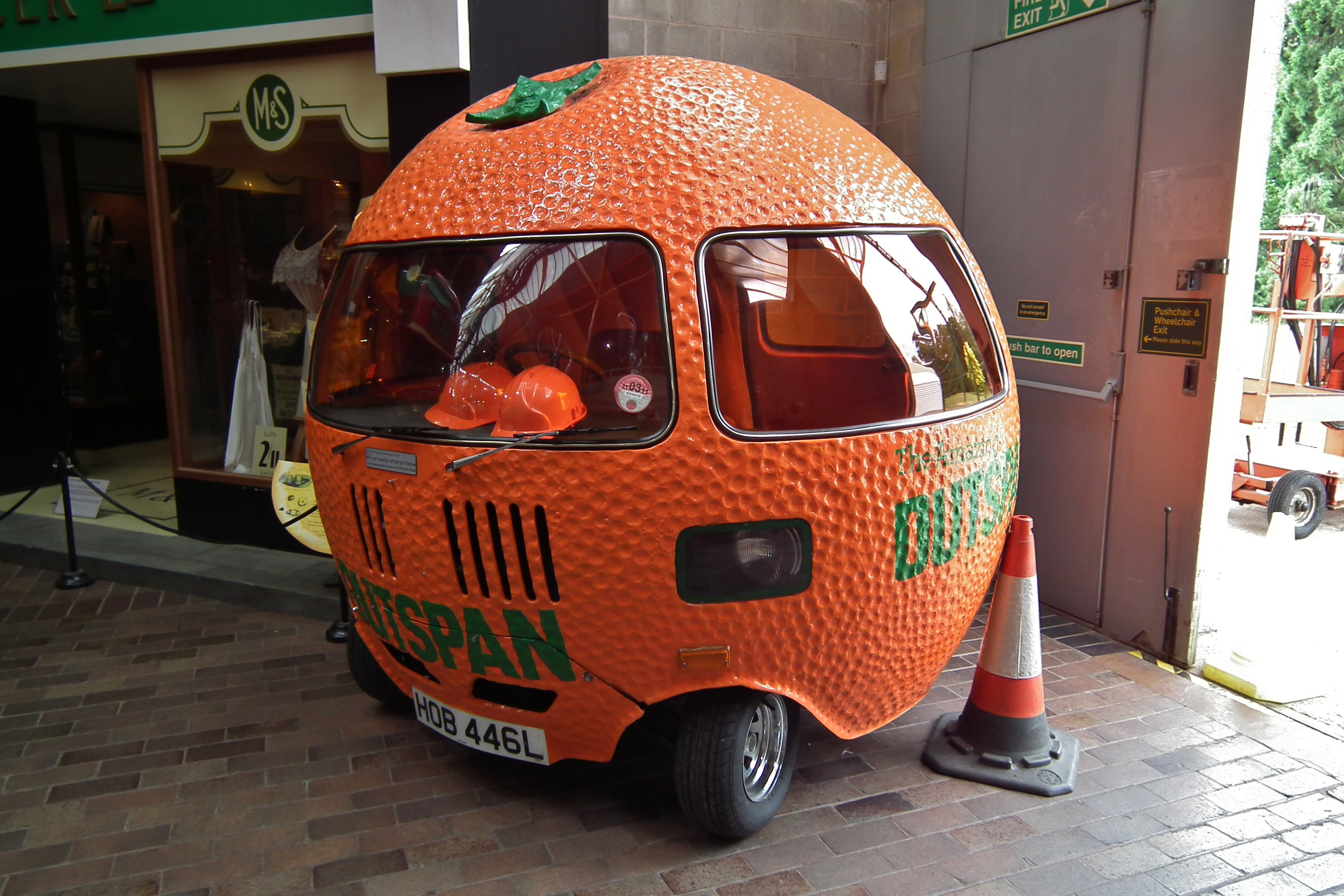
Outspan Orange car

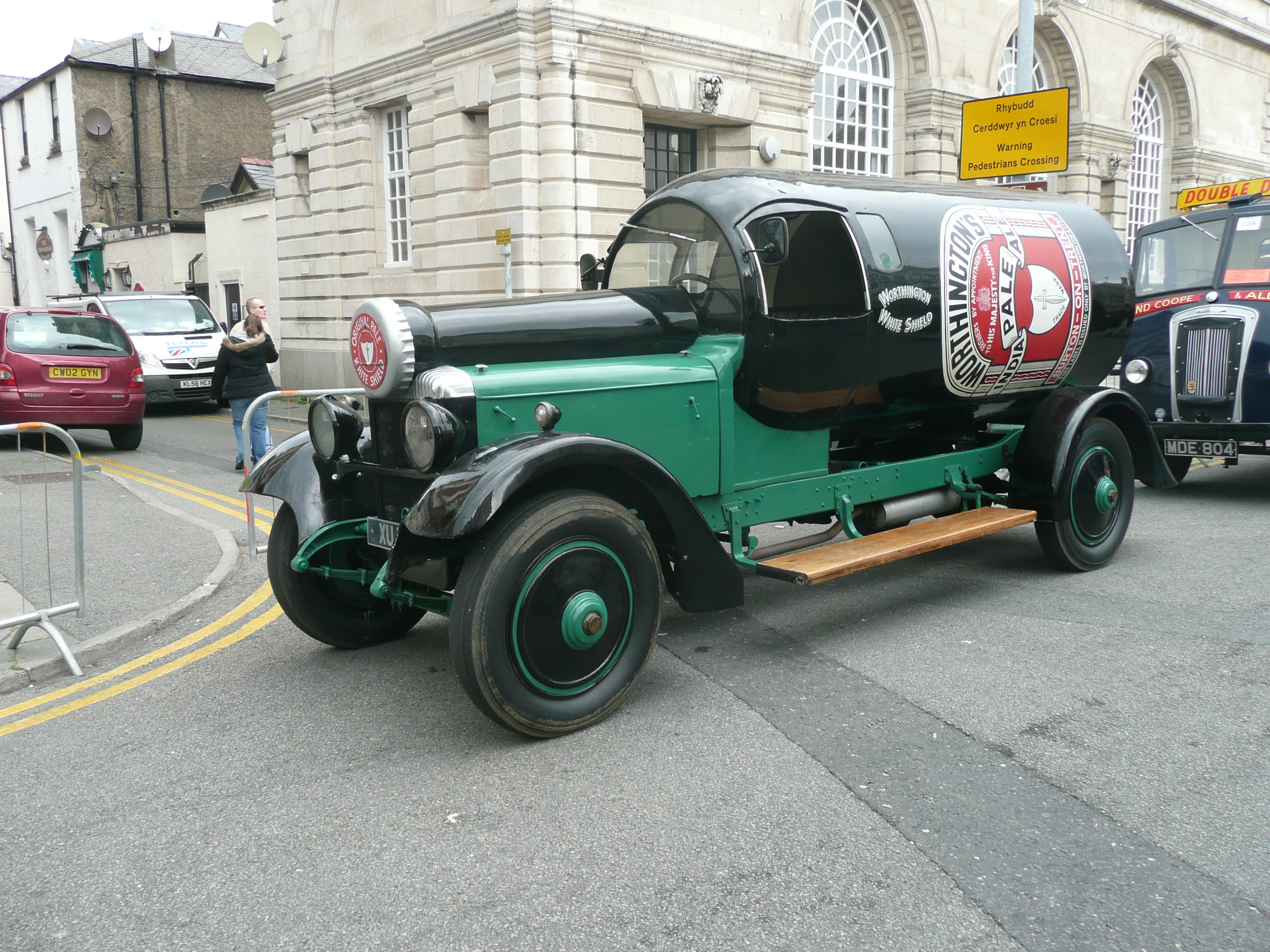
Worthington Beer Bottle Lorry

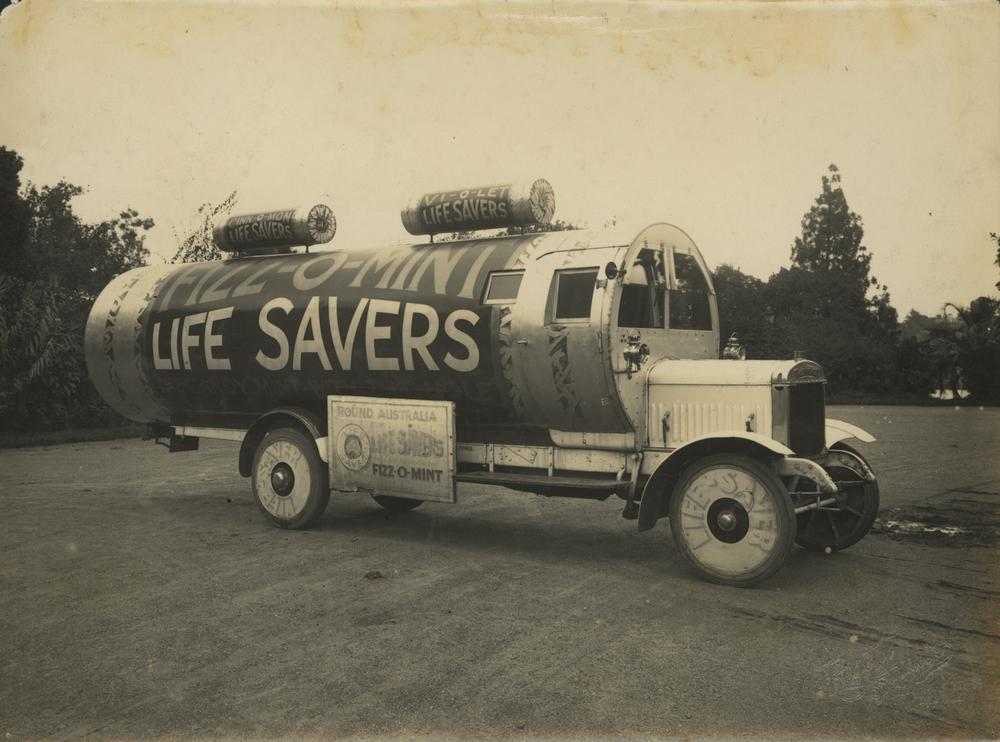
Life Saver vehicle, 1930

== See also ==
- Novelty architecture
- Art car
