= Bootmobile =

Boot-shaped vehicle owned by L.L.Bean

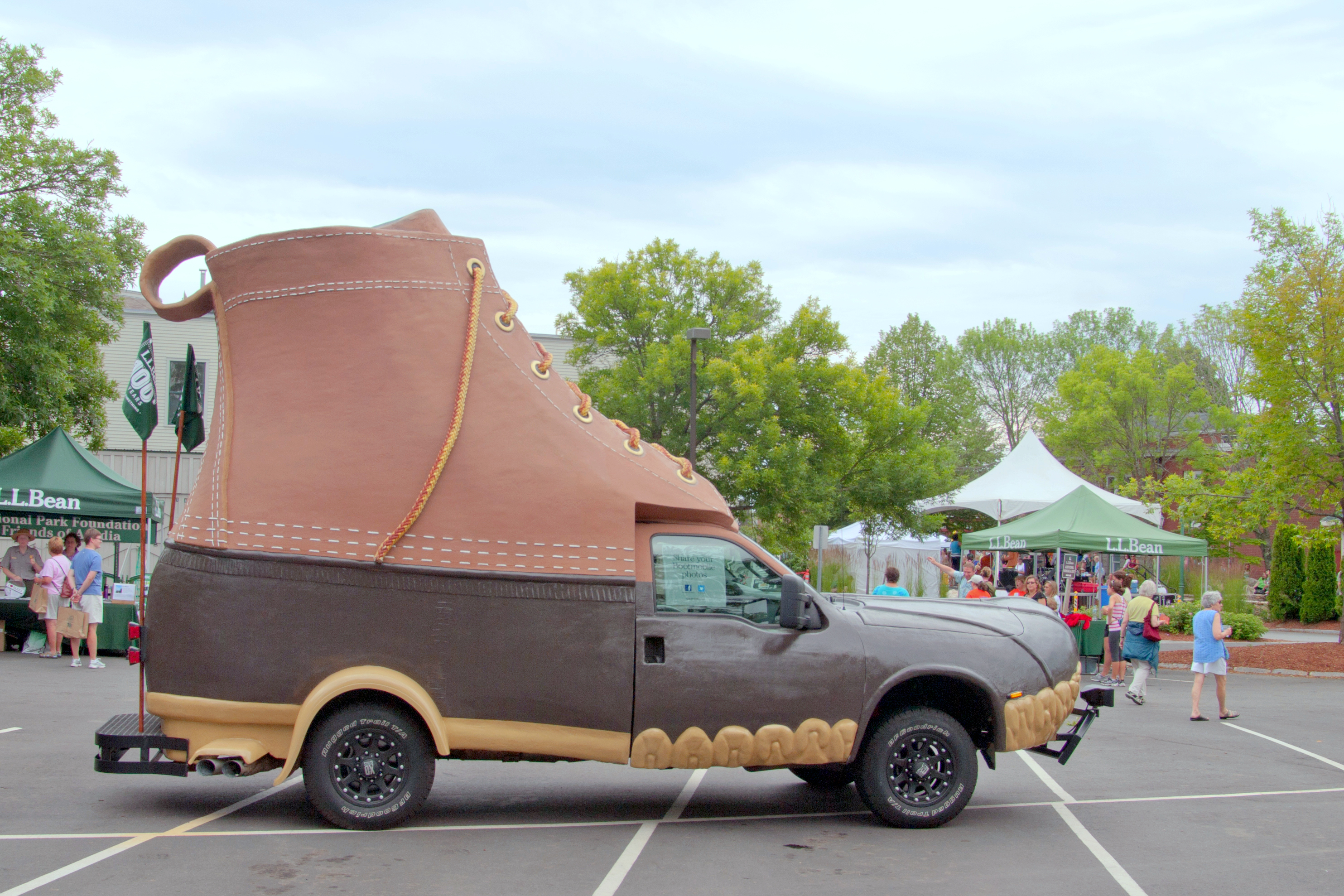
Bootmobile Baxter in Freeport, Maine, 2012

The Bootmobiles are a fleet of brandmobiles created and owned by L.L.Bean, which consist of trucks with custom bodies built to resemble a Bean boot. First introduced for the company's centennial in 2012, the Bootmobiles tour the United States for store openings and events.

== Design and construction ==
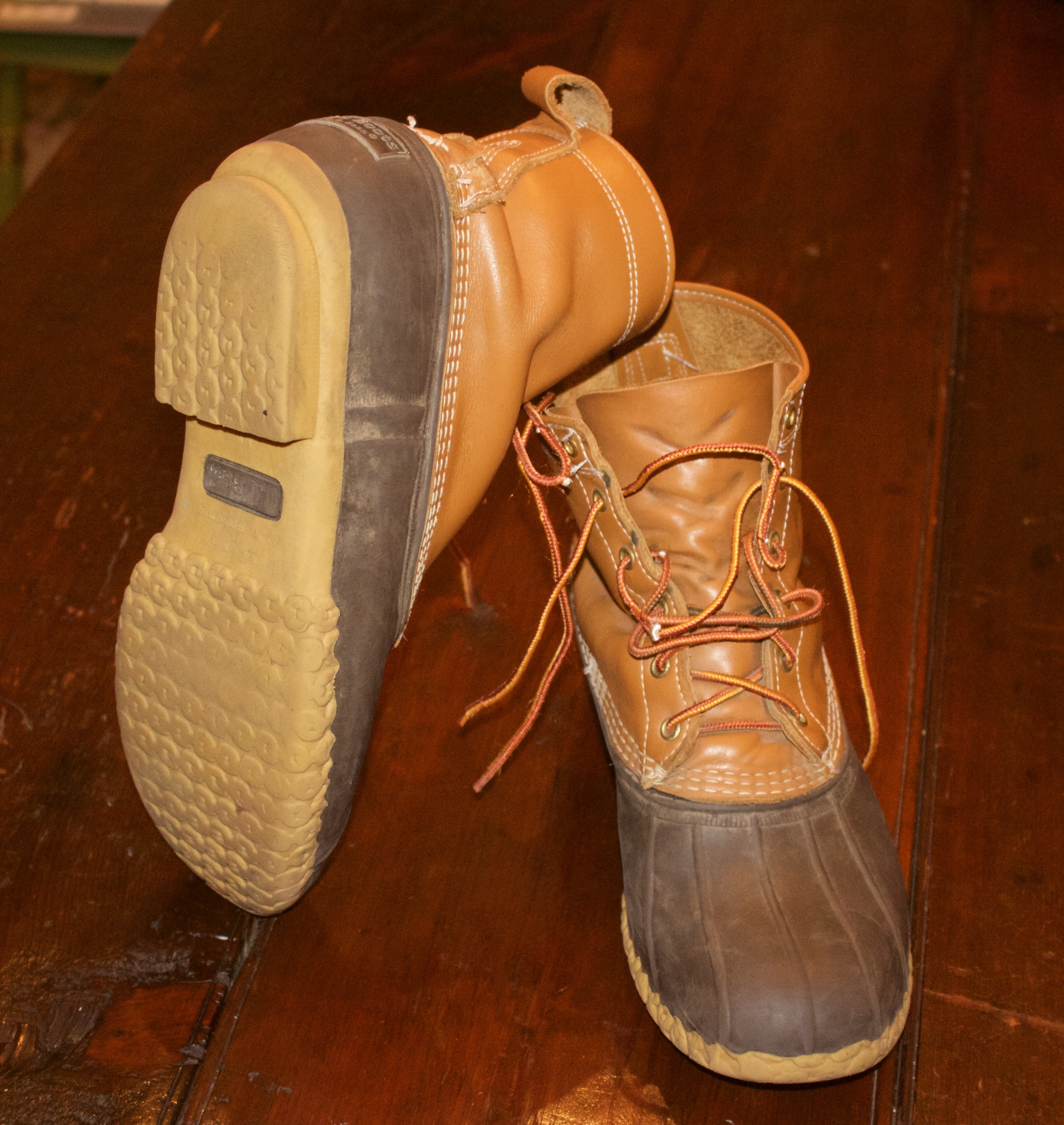
L.L. Bean's Bean Boots, which the Bootmobile is meant to resemble

The original Bootmobile (later named Baxter) was completed in January 2012, and consists of a Ford F-250 Super Duty truck with a custom body constructed by Echo Artz of Kissimmee, Florida. Its body is 13 feet (4.0 m) tall 20 feet (6.1 m) long, and 7 feet (2.1 m) wide, with a steel frame and a fiberglass exterior; an actual Bean boot of comparable proportions would be a size 747.

The laces on each Bootmobile are made from mooring rope, and its eyelets from Bundt cake pans. A second Bootmobile, built on a GMC Sierra chassis, was built in 2013 with a 12-foot-tall body. A third was constructed in 2019 on a Chevrolet Silverado chassis, with an aluminum-framed body; it is equivalent in scale to a size-708 boot. The body of the newest Bootmobile, Sebago, was constructed in 2025 by Craftsmen Industries of St. Charles, Missouri, while another was reportedly built by Turtle Transit of Hudson, Massachusetts.

== Promotional use ==
A small team of L.L.Bean employees drive the Bootmobiles; no special license is required, but each driver must pass a company road test. By 2024, the fleet had visited 25 U.S. states and two provinces of Canada, having traveled about 350,000 miles (563,000 km), primarily in the Northeast.

The Bootmobiles have occasionally been recolored for events. They were painted red to commemorate the Boston Red Sox' World Series championships in 2013 and 2018, and wrapped in pink in partnership with Dunkin' in 2026.

== Fleet ==
As of 2026, L.L.Bean owns four Bootmobiles, three of which are still operated:

- Baxter (license plate LL BEAN) - introduced 2012, based on a Ford F-250, only used occasionally as of 2026
- Casco - introduced 2013, based on a GMC Sierra 2500HD, retired in 2025
- Bigelow (license plate B00TMBL) - introduced in 2019, based on a Chevrolet Silverado 3500HD
- Sebago (license plate BIGF00T) - introduced 2025, based on a Ram 3500

Additionally, L.L.Bean introduced a smaller Bootmobile in Japan in 2017, based on a Toyota Hilux.

== See also ==
- Nutmobile
- Wienermobile
