= Gerstenslager =

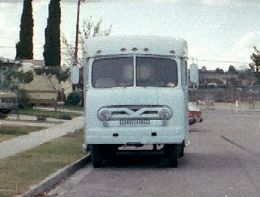
A Gerstenslager bookmobile

The Gerstenslager Company was a maker of past model body panels for several major auto makers. In the 1950s the company was best known for making large custom vehicles such as bookmobiles, canteens and mobile television units.

== History ==
The company started in 1860 as a carriage factory known as the Wehe Company in Marshallville, Ohio. In 1882 blacksmith George Gerstenslager went to work for the company, and by 1904 was the owner and eponym. In 1907, the company moved to Wooster, Ohio. In the early 1920s, Gerstenslager changed from production of buggies, surreys and wagons to van bodies and special truck bodies.

After World War II, Gerstenslager began producing custom-built mobile units such as Bookmobiles, fire rescue vehicles, dental units, canteens, mobile X-ray units, mobile hospitals, as well as mobile television units used by the major networks. The company also built vehicles for the United States Postal Service. In the early 1950s, Gerstenslager designed five Wienermobiles for the Oscar Mayer hot dog producer. In the 1960s, the company expanded to make parts for the automotive, truck and agricultural industries.

After expanding their sheet metal stamping capabilities in support of the custom truck division, the stamping division continued to grow through partnerships with most major automotive manufacturers to make aftermarket parts. In later years the stamping division became the larger part of the company and the custom truck division was shut down in 1986 so the company could focus all resources to the stamping division.

In 1997, Gerstenslager was acquired by Worthington Industries of Columbus, Ohio. In 2011, Worthington merged Gerstenslager into International Tooling Solutions to form ArtiFlex Manufacturing; Worthington remains a part-owner of ArtiFlex.
