= Golden Age of Trucking Museum =

- Established: 1998
- Dissolved: 2010
- Location: Middlebury, Connecticut
- Type: Trucking museum

The Golden Age of Trucking Museum is a defunct trucking museum in Middlebury, Connecticut, United States. Founded in 1998 by Richard and Frances Guerrera, it was a non-profit organization dedicated to trucking, with a focus on trucks of the 1950s. The museum was dedicated on September 23, 2002 and housed in a 32,000 square foot building. Its collection of historic and antique vehicles included the first car registered in Connecticut, a 1902 Oldsmobile, and a 1928 Pierce-Arrow dump truck. Among its trucks were Mack, GMC and Autocar models, including the 1963 Mack B61 that inspired Guerrera to found the museum. The Golden Age of Trucking Museum also featured a collection of toy trucks, hats, state license plates and images relating to trucking. The museum ran a deficit throughout its operation and closed after a 2009 fundraising campaign fell short. The museum's final day of operation was on July 20, 2010. The economic impact of the museum's closure was expected to be small, but according to Steven Frischling of The Boston Globe, the museum made its mark on the auto world. The building has stood vacant since the museum closed.

== History ==
Founded in 1998 by Richard and Frances Guerrera, the Golden Age of Trucking Museum was a non-profit organization dedicated to trucking. The Guerreras owned and operated R.J. Guerrera, a liquid transportation trucking company. Originally, a collection of trucks was restored and stored in barns and garages throughout Connecticut. The Golden Age of Trucking Museum was opened to bring the collection under a single roof. After the property for the museum was purchased in July 1998, Richard Guerrera was diagnosed with cancer. In June 1999, he was transported to the site for an unofficial groundbreaking event. Richard Guerrera died a month later and the facility was completed in 2002. The museum was designed by Frances Guerrera's son-in-law, a general contractor. On September 23, 2002, the museum was formally opened with a ribbon-cutting ceremony in the complete 32,000 square foot building.

The museum never was able to sustain itself through its visitors and it ran a deficit throughout its entire operation; its operating costs were covered by Frances Guerrera. A $100,000 fundraising campaign begun in 2009 had raised only $20,000 by July 2010, and on July 6, 2010, the board of directors decided to close the museum. The museum's final day was on July 20, 2010 and also featured a gathering of antique cars in a "Cruise Night" event. The building has stood vacant since the museum closed.

== Collection ==
The Golden Age of Trucking Museum featured a collection of historic trucks, cars and other items related to the trucking operation, with a special focus on trucking in the 1950s. Many of the historic vehicles on display were noted for their rarity or otherwise unique quality. These include the first registered car in Connecticut, a 1902 Oldsmobile, and a 1928 Pierce-Arrow five-to-seven-ton dump truck, one of only 55 Pierce-Arrow trucks produced. The displays included a 1916 Mack paddy wagon, a 1929 Diamond T truck, a 1931 Ford Model AA service car, a 1936 Ford Roadster Deluxe and a Model T Ford tank truck. A 1953 Fageol moving van with original owner's banner was located near some surreys and carriages. Other early period vehicles on display included a 1912 Autocar two-cylinder transit bus, a 1914 Trumbull, a 1915 Barker, a 1917 Republic Model 10 one-ton express and a 1920 3½-ton Mack AC.

Trucks of the 1930s and 1940s included a 1937 Ford tow truck, a 1940 Dodge VK, a 1940 Mack FN, a 1941 Federal Model 25K and a 1942 Dodge WC-21. The 1950s' vehicles were represented by a 1952 Diamond T 950RSa, 1955 IH DFC405 and a 1955 GMC Model 860. Later vehicles included two Autocar trucks, a 1962 DC75T and a 1974 DC9364 ten-wheel dump truck. The 1963 Mack B61 was of special importance to the founder Richard Guerrera who acquired the truck with the purchase of a local company, Oil Transport. Guerrera sold the truck and reacquired the same vehicle in 1985 to restore it. This Mack B61 was described as the "impetus" for the museum. Also on display was a 1996 Volvo prototype truck cab. From 2007 to 2008, the museum exhibited a 1925 Thermosmobile, a promotional truck built on a Ford Model TT chassis for the American Thermos Bottle Company.

Other items on display included "Bumpers", a dog sculpture made of Mack truck bumpers and a collection of toy trucks, hats, state license plates and images relating to trucking. The museum also included an exhibit featuring kerosene lamps. According to Stephen Wood, the kerosene lamps might have come from the defunct Kerosene Lamp Museum. Also on display was Stephen Guman's Guinness World Record breaking Popsicle stick structure, made of 396,000 sticks.

== Impact ==
Throughout its operation, the Golden Age of Trucking Museum was one of two trucking museums in Connecticut. Steven Frischling of The Boston Globe wrote, "It may seem strange that two trucking museums would be located in the same state, but [t]he Haul of Fame truck museum and [t]he Golden Age of Trucking Museum make their individual marks on the auto world." The economic impact of the museum's closure was not expected to be large according to John Cookson, co-chairman of Economic and Industrial Development Commission. Janet Serra, the director for the Western Connecticut Convention and Visitor's Bureau, said the effect of closure would not be immediate, but noted it could impact tourism and area hotels.

== See also ==
- List of museums in Connecticut
