= Mr. Peanut =

Mascot for Planters Peanuts

- Planters character
- First appearance: 1916
- Created by: Antonio Gentile
- Voiced by: Robert Downey Jr. (2010–2013); Bill Hader (2013–2017); Keith Ferguson (2020–present); Woody Harrelson (in The Electric State)
- Company: Planters

In-universe information
- Full name: Bartholomew Richard Fitzgerald-Smythe
- Species: Arachis hypogaea
- Gender: Male
- Occupation: Mascot, gentleman, hero

Mr. Peanut is the advertising logo and mascot of Planters, an American snack-food company owned by Hormel. He is depicted as an anthropomorphic peanut in its shell, wearing the formal clothing of an old-fashioned gentleman, with a top hat, monocle, white gloves, spats, and cane. He is reported to be of British heritage and has the proper name of Bartholomew Richard Fitzgerald-Smythe.

== History ==
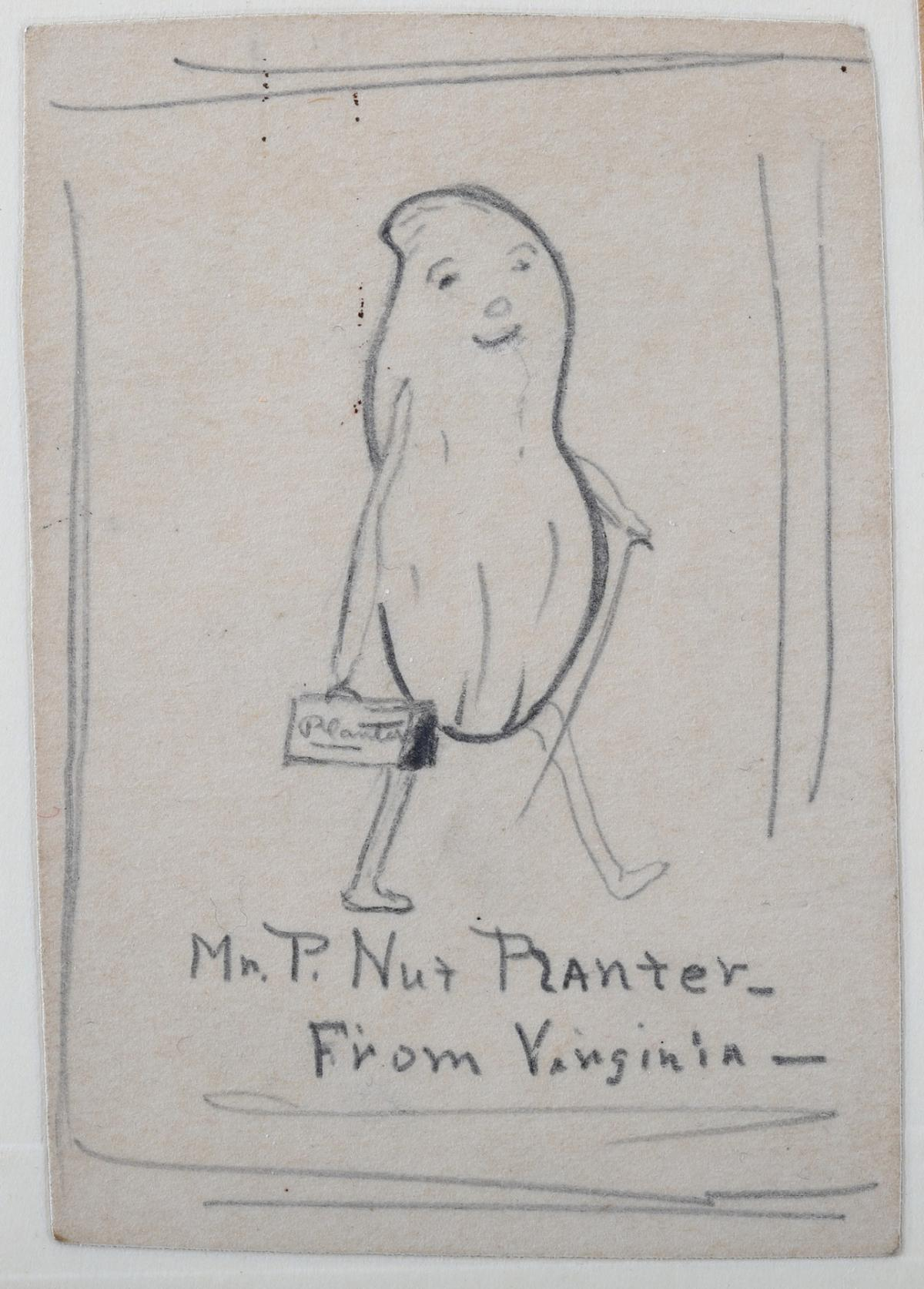
Antonio Gentile's original drawing of Mr. Peanut

Planters Peanut Company was founded in 1906 in Wilkes-Barre, Pennsylvania, by Amedeo Obici, and incorporated two years later as the Planters Nut and Chocolate Company. In 1916, young schoolboy Antonio Gentile submitted drawings of an anthropomorphic peanut to a design contest. When his design was chosen, commercial artist Andrew S. Wallach added the monocle and top hat to create the iconic image. Gentile's family received five dollars for winning the contest. Obici befriended them and paid Antonio’s, and four of his siblings', way through college. After Obici paid Antonio's way through medical school as well, Antonio became a doctor in Newport News, Virginia, where he died of a heart attack in 1939.

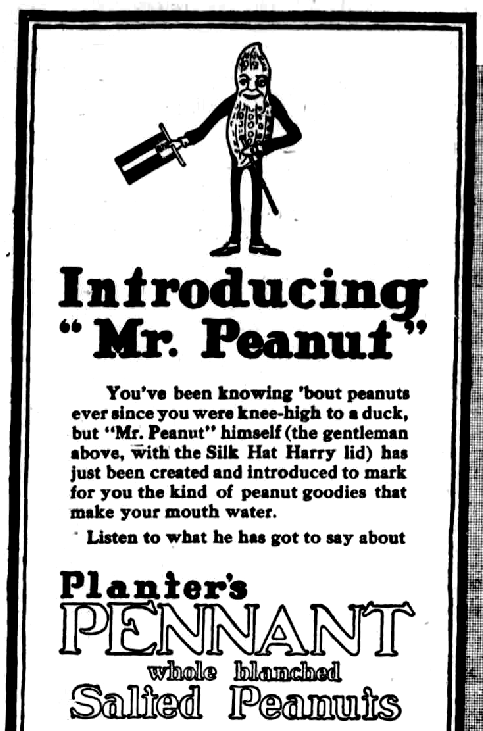
Mr Peanut's Debut Appearance (1916?)

There is a disputed claim that Frank P. Krize Sr., a Wilkes-Barre artist and head of the Suffolk plant, added the monocle, top hat, and cane. Wallach's daughter, Virginia, maintains that Krize joined the project after Mr. Peanut was created. However, neither Planters' history nor other sources still in circulation positively identify the artist.

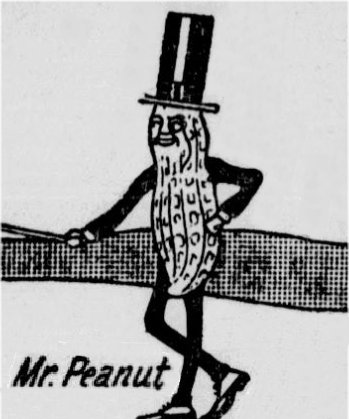
Mr Peanut in a 1917 advertisement

By the mid-1930s, the raffish figure came to symbolize the entire peanut industry. Mr. Peanut has appeared on almost every Planters package and advertisement and is one of the best-known icons in advertising history. He has appeared in many TV commercials as an animated cartoon character. More recent commercials have shown him stop-motion animated in a real-world setting.

In 2005, Mr. Peanut was shown in MasterCard's "Icons" commercial during Super Bowl XXXIX, which depicts several advertising mascots having dinner together.

In 2006, Planters held an online contest to determine whether to add a bow tie, cufflinks, or pocketwatch to Mr. Peanut. The public voted for no changes.

While the character's television commercials were often accompanied by an accented narrator, Mr. Peanut never had dialogue. On November 8, 2010, Planters announced that actor Robert Downey Jr. would become Mr. Peanut's first-ever voice actor.

In 2011, Mr. Peanut's "stunt double", Peanut Butter Doug, was introduced to tie in with the Planter's Peanut Butter launch. The character is voiced by Kevin Dillon.

On July 1, 2013, Planters cast comedian and Saturday Night Live alumnus Bill Hader as the voice for a campaign focusing on its Planters Nut-rition product line.

In 2017, the Virginia General Assembly passed a joint resolution commending Mr. Peanut.

In 2018, Mr. Peanut was once again revamped, albeit for the first time since 2009, and became silent again.

=== Baby Nut and Peanut Jr. ===
On January 22, 2020, Planters released a teaser for its Super Bowl LIV commercial featuring Mr. Peanut, Wesley Snipes and Matt Walsh. The trio was shown hanging onto a branch after accidentally driving the Nutmobile off a cliff to avoid an armadillo with Mr. Peanut electing to let go and fall to his death onto the Nutmobile, which then explodes. The company's social media outlets stated that his funeral would be the subject of Planters' Super Bowl ad.

Planters suspended the campaign shortly after the Calabasas helicopter crash on January 26, which killed all passengers including former NBA player Kobe Bryant. It eventually resumed the campaign with the Super Bowl commercial, which showed Snipes and Walsh presiding over the funeral of Mr. Peanut, also attended by fellow mascots Kool-Aid Man and Mr. Clean. Kool-Aid Man's tears combined with sunlight, causing a new, younger incarnation of Mr. Peanut, dubbed "Baby Nut", to grow from the soil. After brief baby sounds, Baby Nut quotes "Just kidding, I'm back". Everyone celebrates Mr. Peanut's revival as he asks "Where's my monocle"?

After the premiere of the commercial, the Planters Twitter account was used to make posts in character as Baby Nut. It also retweeted posts from several Baby Nut meme accounts created before the ad aired, prompting Twitter to suspend them under the presumption that they were created by the company's agency to manipulate the platform in violation of its terms of use.

The campaign faced a mixed reaction from viewers, while comparisons were drawn between the character and other juvenile incarnations of characters seen in media, such as Grogu and Groot. Explaining the intent of the campaign, a spokesman for Planters' advertising agency cited the examples of superhero deaths in the Marvel Cinematic Universe for how such a death could connect with viewers and potential customers.

In August 2020, a continuation of the campaign launched, where Baby Nut is revealed to have aged into a 21-year-old young adult, "Peanut Jr." This decision resulted in much more volatile reactions than Baby Nut's campaign, with a tweet encouraging others to block Peanut Jr.'s account becoming viral.

=== A Nut Above, 2021 refresh ===
The Baby Nut campaign ended in February 2021, with Mr. Peanut returning to adulthood; Planters announced it would not "spend $5 million dropping [the character] off a cliff"; the company introduced a new campaign, "A Nut Above", and announced that it would highlight people "who made the world a little less nutty" in 2020. In preparation for the sale of Planters by Kraft to Hormel, Planters relaunched the Mr. Peanut character in May 2021 with new commercials depicting a two-dimensional, animated version of the mascot, and focusing on the nutritional qualities of its products.

== In popular culture ==
In the 2010 novel Mr. Peanut by Adam Ross, a man fantasizes about killing his peanut-allergic wife by force-feeding her peanuts. "He poured out a handful and ate them and then wiped the salt from his empty hand on his pants. He looked at the chipper Planters Peanuts man tipping his top hat hello and thought about how one bite could kill Alice dead."

The artist Vincent Trasov, dressed as Mr. Peanut, ran as a joke candidate in the 1974 civic elections in Vancouver, British Columbia.

A robotic version of Mr. Peanut appears in the 2025 Netflix film The Electric State, based on the 2018 illustrated novel by Simon Stålenhag, motion-captured by Terry Notary and voiced by Woody Harrelson.
