= George Molchan =

American spokesman

George A. Molchan
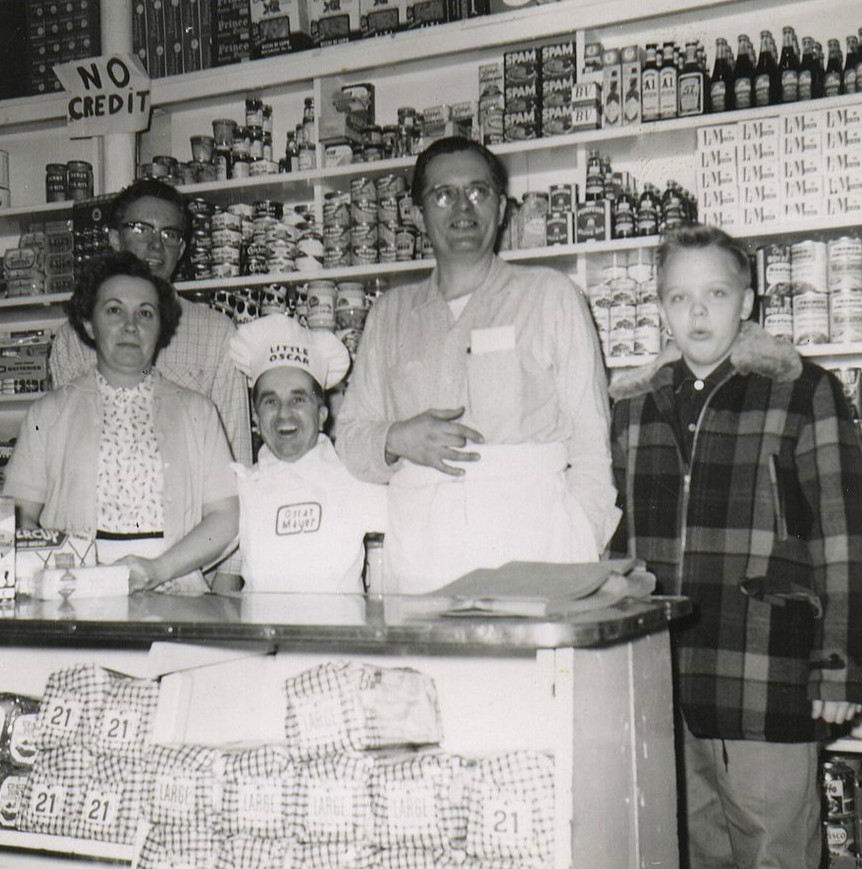
- Molchan as Little Oscar at a personal appearance.
- Born: June 5, 1922; Llanfair, Pennsylvania, U.S.
- Died: April 12, 2005 (aged 82); Hobart, Indiana, U.S.
- Occupation: Actor

George A. Molchan (June 5, 1922 – April 12, 2005) was an American spokesperson, most famous for his work as Little Oscar for the Oscar Mayer meat company.

Molchan grew up in the Gary, Indiana area; as a young boy, he received hormone treatments to try to make him grow taller. His lack of height was a concern to him; a local theater manager who sympathized with his worries managed to contact Meinhardt Raabe, who was "Little Oscar", the spokesman for the Oscar Mayer company. Raabe met with Molchan and assured him that if he continued his education, he would have a bright future ahead.

Molchan took his advice, earning both an accounting degree from his local junior college and a degree in communications from Chicago's Columbia College. He went to work as a bookkeeper for Pepsi-Cola, staying with the job until 1951. Oscar Mayer had plans to expand its promotion of the "Little Oscar" character. The company decided to put more than one Wienermobile on the road to travel the United States, which meant they were in need of more spokespersons to do the same work Raabe did. Raabe contacted Molchan and suggested he apply for one of the positions. Molchan was hired and was based in Chicago; the other additional Wienermobiles were based in Los Angeles, Philadelphia, and Madison, Wisconsin, the company's home.

He traveled the United States in his Wienermobile for 20 years, making appearances at parades, shopping centers and grocery stores. At each appearance, Molchan gave away plastic "wiener whistles", which were shaped like a hot dog with the company's logo on them that whistled the Oscar Mayer tune when blown. During many of these cross-country trips, he was accompanied by Stan and Denise Stanley, both of whom were responsible for various roles, ranging from driving the Wienermobile to distributing toys. As a result of the Stanleys' efforts during the early 1980s, they were recognized during both the 1982 and 1983 year-end reports. After the company phased out the Wienermobiles, Molchan remained on the job for them. He relocated to Orlando, Florida for a job as "Little Oscar" in the Oscar Mayer restaurant at Disney World in the mid-1970s. Molchan worked at Disney for 16 years, retiring in 1987. Upon his retirement, Oscar Mayer also retired the "Little Oscar" character that began with Meinhardt Raabe in 1936.

After retirement, Molchan did some part-time character work, but was always recognized as "Little Oscar". He eventually moved back to Indiana to be near family members. When Molchan was buried in a Merrillville, Indiana cemetery on April 16, 2005, Oscar Mayer sent one of the Wienermobiles to the cemetery, where it was parked near his gravesite during the ceremonies. Molchan's mourners also sang "Oh, I wish I were an Oscar Mayer wiener", and followed it with wiener whistle toots of tribute.
