= Wienermobile =

Sausage-shaped promotional vehicles

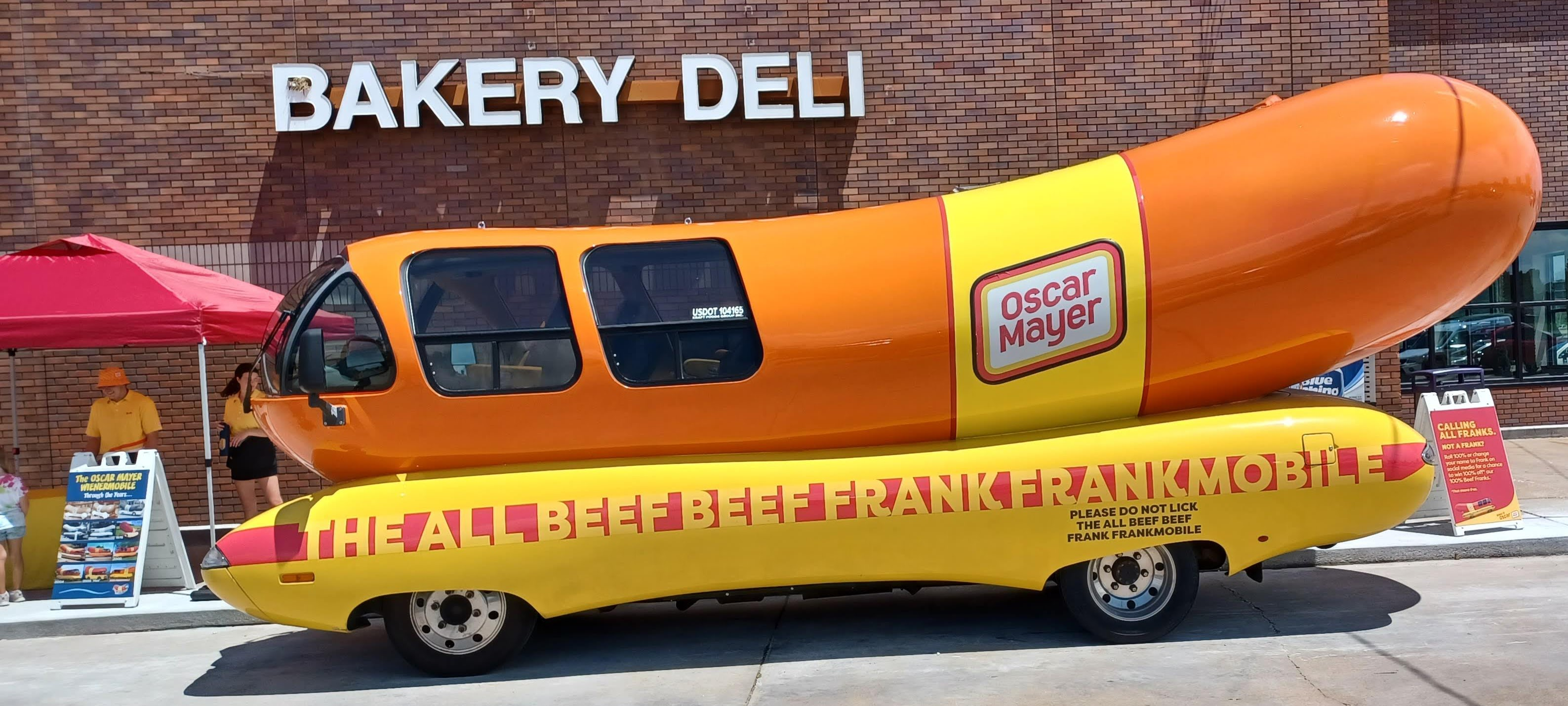
- Oscar Mayer Wienermobile, seen in its "All Beef Beef Frank Frankmobile" variation, in Oklahoma City, Oklahoma, in 2023

Overview
- Production: 6 (current version)

Body and chassis
- Related: Mini Cooper S Hardtop

Powertrain
- Engine: 1.6L Supercharged I-4 (current)

A fleet of brandmobiles that resemble a hot dog on a bun, called "Wienermobiles", are used to promote and advertise Oscar Mayer products in the United States. The first Wienermobile was created by Oscar Mayer's nephew, Carl G. Mayer, in 1936. For a brief period in 2023, it was renamed the "Frankmobile", but following popular demand, the name was changed back to "Wienermobile."

== First version and debut ==
The initial 1936 vehicle—not yet termed a "Wienermobile" in publicity—weighed 2000 pounds and cost $5000 to fabricate. Its first public appearance was in Janesville, Wisconsin on October 16–17, 1936, having been completed in Chicago the previous day. Appearing with the new vehicle was Oscar Mayer's "World’s Smallest Chef"— "19 years old, 42 inches tall, and weighs 45 pounds". The identity of this first "Little Oscar" making promotional appearances is not known. Meinhardt Raabe took the position sometime after his mid-1937 hiring by Oscar Mayer, and held it until at least 1941.

The Wienermobile promotional name debuted only in 1951. In the 1936-41 years publicity for the vehicle was variously "Wiener Truck", "Oscar Mayer Truck", "German Wiener Sound Car", "World's Largest Wiener Car", and "Giant Wiener Sound Truck".

== History ==
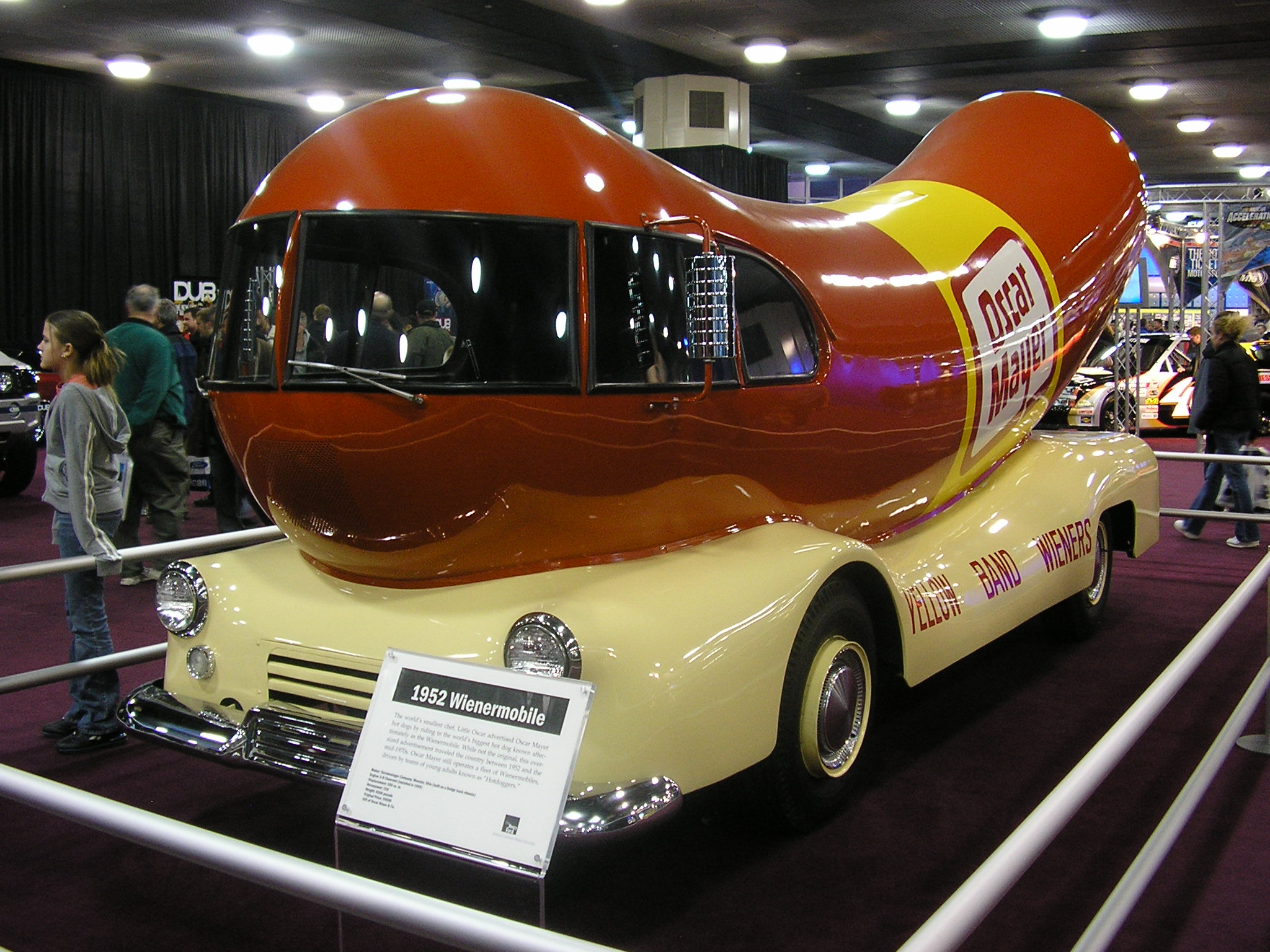
The 1952 Oscar Mayer Wienermobile at the 2005 North American International Auto Show

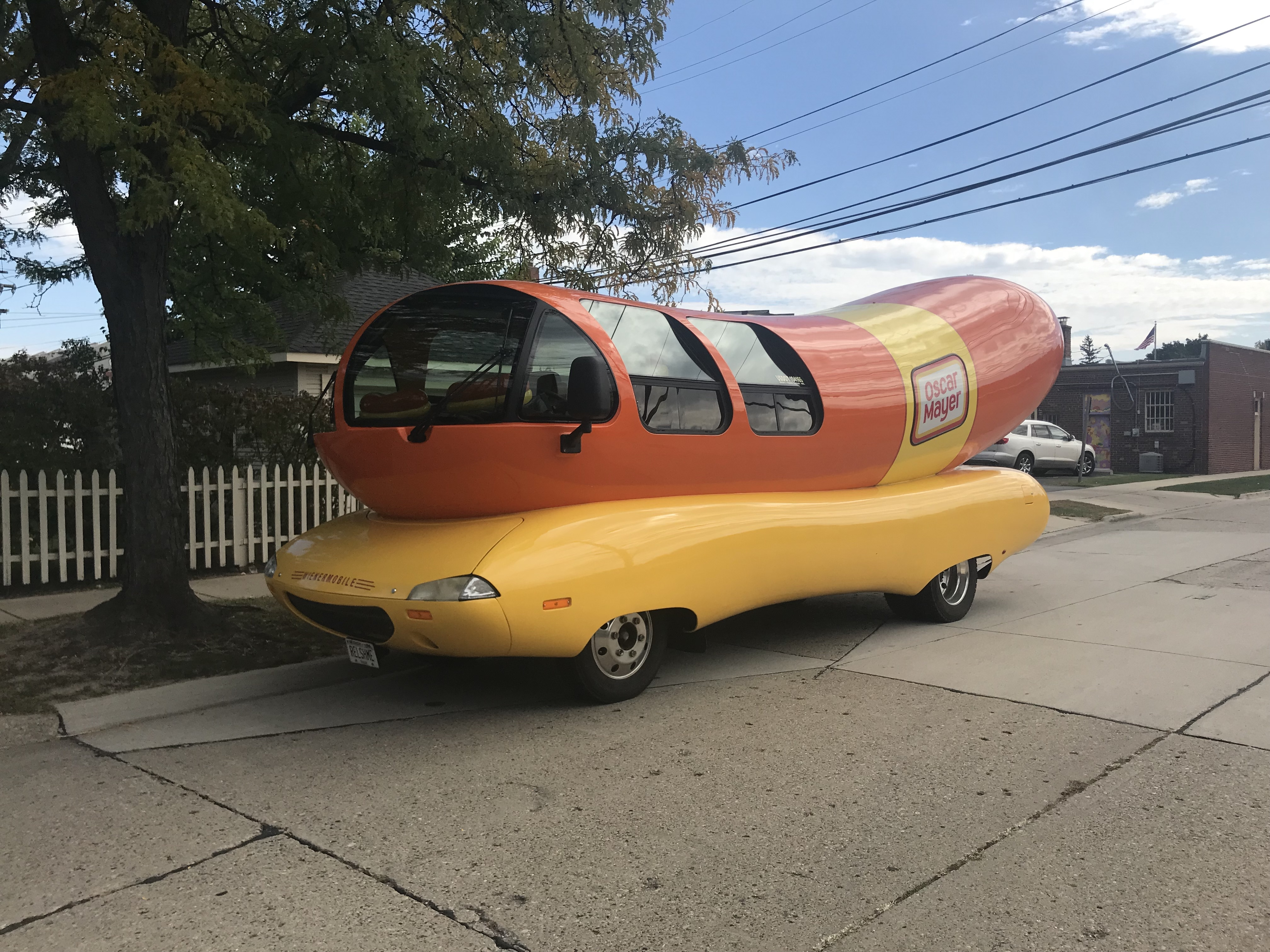
An Oscar Mayer Wienermobile in Royal Oak, Michigan, in 2022

The Oscar Mayer Wienermobile has evolved from Carl Mayer's original 1936 vehicle to the vehicles seen on the road today. Although the first Wienermobile was scrapped for metal in the 1940s to aid the US Army during World War II, Oscar Mayer and the Gerstenslager Company created several new vehicles using a Dodge chassis or a Willys Jeep chassis in the 1950s. The 1952 (Note: The vehicle was completed and first appeared in 1951, though perhaps on a "model year 1952" chassis.) model is on display at the Henry Ford Museum in Dearborn, Michigan. Beginning in the 1950s Wienermobiles were usually piloted by "Little Oscar" (portrayed by George Molchan) who would visit stores, schools, orphanages, and children's hospitals and participate in parades and festivals. Noted industrial designer Brooks Stevens is also credited with a "new look" 1950s design, taking advantages of the possibilities of modern molded fiberglass construction "to put the wiener in the bun" in 1958.

In 1988, Oscar Mayer had a fleet of six Wienermobiles built using converted Chevrolet van chassis; by 1995 all had accumulated more than 250,000 miles.

In 1995, a new version increased the size of the Wienermobile to a length of 27 feet (8.2 m) and a height of 11 feet (3.4 m).

In June 2017, the company introduced several new hot dog-themed vehicles, including the WienerCycle, WienerRover, and WienerDrone.

In May 2023, Oscar Mayer announced that it was renaming the Wienermobile the Frankmobile, to promote a new recipe for its all-beef franks. It was suggested that the name change would not be permanent. The name was changed back in September 2023.

=== Wienie 500 ===
During festivities on Carb Day at the Indianapolis 500 in 2025 and 2026, all six Wienermobiles have taken part in the Wienie 500. The event is a two-lap, 5 miles (8.0 km) race around the Indianapolis Motor Speedway oval. The winner in 2025 was "Slaw Dog" and the winner in 2026 was "New York Dog".

=== List of Wienermobiles ===
Year	Manufacturer/Builder	Chassis	Engine
1936	General Body Company – Chicago, Illinois	Purpose-built chassis	N/A
1952	Gerstenslager – Wooster, Ohio	Dodge chassis	N/A
1958	Brooks Stevens	Willys Jeep chassis	N/A
1969	Oscar Mayer – Madison, Wisconsin	Chevrolet chassis with Ford Thunderbird taillights	V6 engine
1975	Plastics Products – Milwaukee, Wisconsin	fibreglass/styrofoam replica of 1969	V6 engine
1988	Stevens Automotive Corporation – Milwaukee, Wisconsin	Chevrolet van chassis with Ford Thunderbird taillights	V6 engine
1995	Harry Bentley Bradley for Carlin Manufacturing – Fresno, California	Purpose-built chassis with Pontiac Grand Am headlights, Pontiac Trans Am taillights	N/A
2000	Craftsmen Industries – St. Charles, Missouri	GMC W-series chassis	5700 Vortec V8
2001	Craftsmen Industries - San Antonio, Texas	RAM 1500-series chassis, flipped axle	5.2L Magnum V8
2004	Prototype Source – Santa Barbara, California	GMC W-series chassis with Pontiac Firebird taillights	6.0L 300–6000 Vortec V8
2008 ("mini" version)	Prototype Source – Santa Barbara, California	Mini Cooper S Hardtop	1.6L Supercharged I-4

Source: Oscar Mayer

== Wienermobile drivers ==
Six Wienermobiles operate throughout the United States.

The driver of a Wienermobile is called The Hotdogger. The Hotdogger's job is to "meat" and greet people around the country. The duties of a Hotdogger include:

"...sharing photos and videos on social media, answering questions about the brand and the vehicle (the most frequently asked question is if there's a bathroom in the back, to which they respond: 'No, it's not a Weenie-bago'), and distributing swag."

Only college seniors who are about to graduate are eligible to be Hotdoggers. Applicants should be getting their BA or BS, preferably in public relations, journalism, communications, advertising, or marketing. A Hotdogger's assignment is for one year only. Recruiting for each year's new Hotdogger cadre involves current Hotdoggers and Oscar Mayer recruiters visiting college campuses across the country. In 2018, 7,000 people applied to be Hotdoggers. As each Wienermobile carries two Hotdoggers, only 12 Hotdoggers are selected each year. Former US House Speaker Paul Ryan was a Hotdogger while in college.

== Notable incidents ==
On July 5, 1973, an abandoned Wienermobile was recovered by Seattle police about ten miles from the city's Oscar Mayer facility, where it had been stolen.

On June 18, 2002, a Virginia trooper--whose job was "to stop large vehicles that might be carrying terrorist explosives" near the Pentagon--halted the touring Wienermobile and "directed it to an exit that would allow the vehicle to bypass the Pentagon."

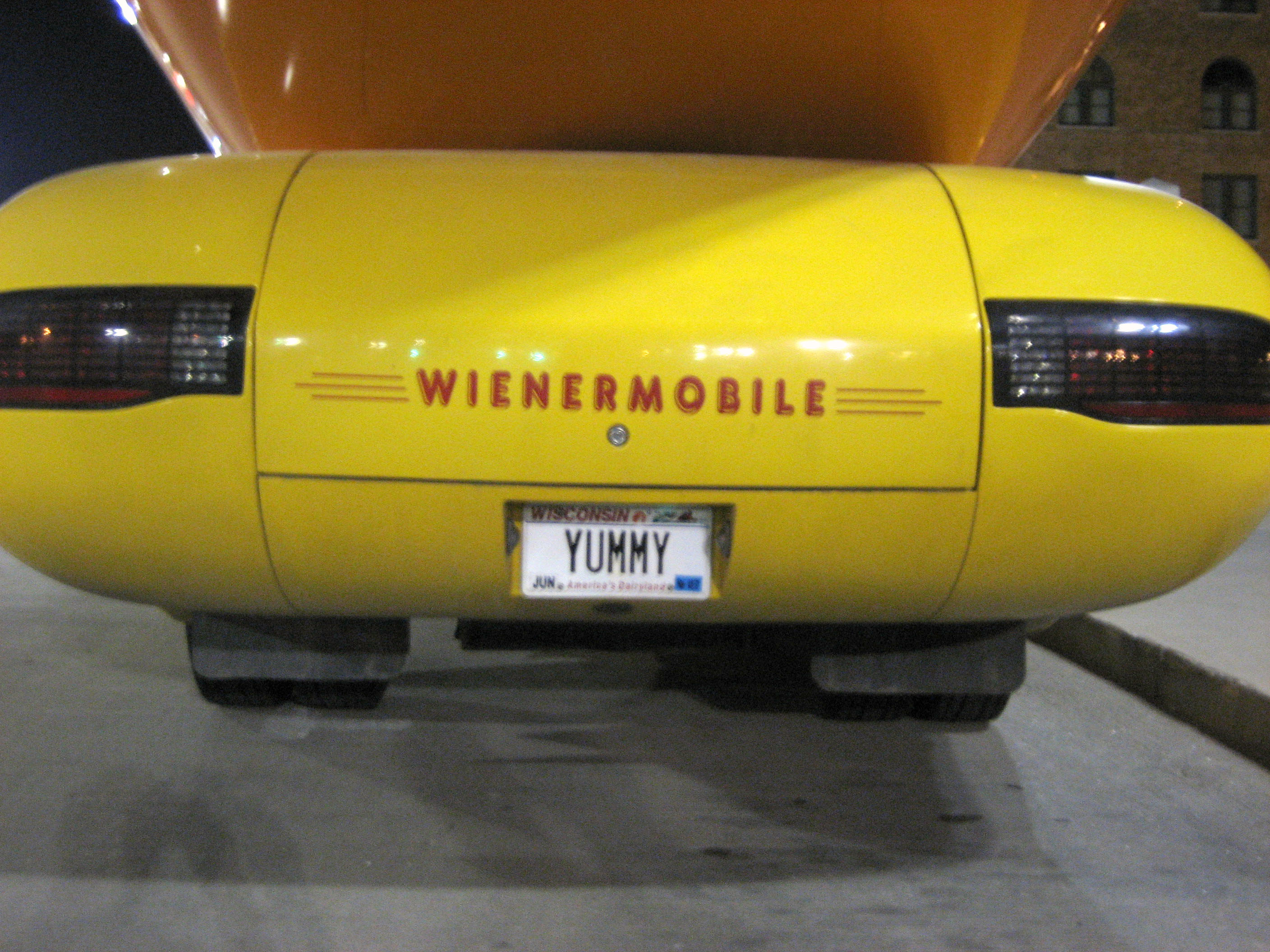
The Oscar Mayer Wienermobile in Omaha, Nebraska, in August 2006

In June 2007, a Wienermobile with the Wisconsin vanity license plate of YUMMY made headlines after being stopped by an Arizona Department of Public Safety officer for having an allegedly stolen license plate. The officer had observed the Wienermobile slowing traffic and checked the license plate to determine if the vehicle was street legal. The license plate came back as being stolen from Columbia, Missouri, so the officer stopped the Wienermobile and detained the driver. Oscar Mayer had not notified police that the company had obtained a duplicate replacement plate after the previous one was stolen, and that it should be considered stolen only if not on a Wienermobile. The Wienermobile was released soon after the error was discovered.

On July 22, 2024, a Wienermobile was hit by a car while driving on Interstate 294 near Oak Brook, Illinois and flipped on its side when the driver lost control. No injuries were reported, though the vehicle itself had visible damage.

== See also ==
- Bootmobile
- Nutmobile
