= Planters =

Snack food brand specializing in peanuts

- Planters logo, Mr. Peanut, first created by a grade schooler Antonio Gentile in a contest in 1916
- Product type: Peanut
- Current owner: Hormel Foods
- Country: United States
- Introduced: 1906; 120 years ago
- Markets: United States
- Previous owners: Kraft Heinz
- Website: www.planters.com

Planters Nut & Chocolate Company is an American snack food company owned by Hormel Foods. Planters is best known for its processed nuts and for the Mr. Peanut icon that symbolizes them. Mr. Peanut was created by grade schooler Antonio Gentile for a 1916 contest to design the company's brand icon. The design was modified by a commercial artist and has continued to change over the years.

== History ==
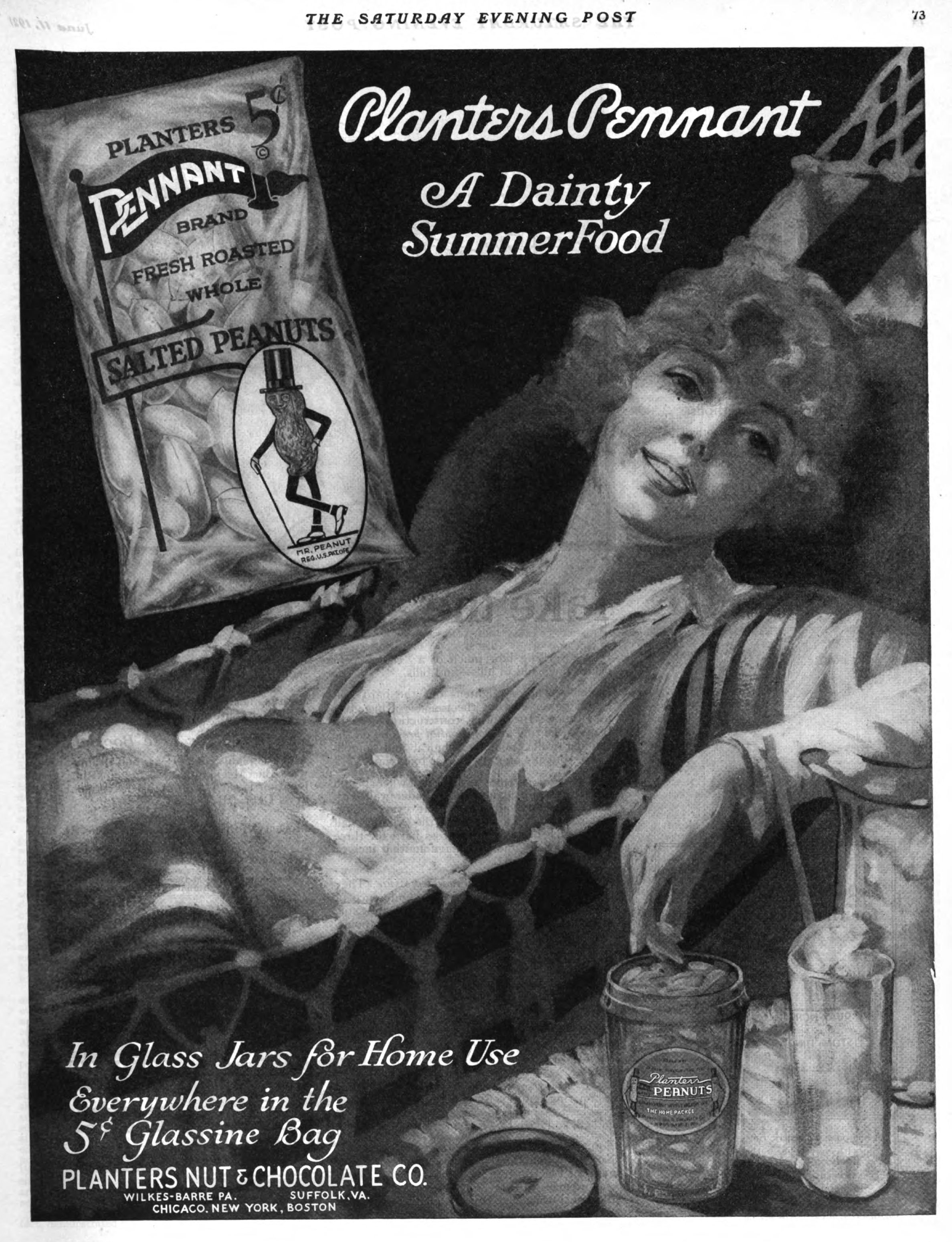
Planters Nut & Chocolate Company advertisement in The Saturday Evening Post, 1921

Planters was founded by Italian immigrant Amedeo Obici in Wilkes-Barre, Pennsylvania. Obici started his career in the US as a bellhop and fruit stand vendor in Scranton, Pennsylvania. He later moved to Wilkes-Barre, opened his own fruit stand, and invested in a peanut roaster. Obici turned peddler within a few years, using a horse and wagon and calling himself "The Peanut Specialist". In 1906, Obici entered a partnership with Mario Peruzzi. Peruzzi had developed his own method of blanching whole roasted peanuts, doing away with the troublesome hulls and skins; and so with six employees, two large roasters, and crude machinery, Planters was founded. Amedeo Obici believed that prices and first profits were as important as repeat business, focusing his operation on quality and brand name for continued success. In 1908, the firm was incorporated as Planters Nut and Chocolate Company. By 1913, Obici had moved to Suffolk, Virginia, and opened the company's first mass production plant and facility there. In 1950, the company created a puzzle called "PLANTERSPEANUTSPUZZLE" and offered prizes for that.

When Amadeo Obici died in 1947, Mario Peruzzi became president of Planters. and would serve until his own death in December 1955. It was during Peruzzi's term that a strike by Local 26 of the Food, Tobacco, Agricultural and Allied Workers union would affect what had become the world's largest peanut processing facility at Planters' location in Suffolk.

In February 1956, Frank A. English, an employee with 40 years of service, became the president.

Standard Brands took over Planters Nut and Chocolate Co. in 1960, beginning with the purchase of 114,345 shares—nearly 50% of the company stock—for $12 million from three philanthropic trusts set up by Obici. However, Planters fought the acquisition, with Planters' president, Michael English, claiming that the trustees had refused the offer, as only two of the five trustees had approved the sale, with the other three wanting to evaluate other pending offers. The issue, whether individual trustee Joseph F. Rocereto had the power to settle disputed decisions of the trustees, went to court when Standard Brands filed suit in Federal District Court in Scranton to force delivery of the shares. While the suit was pending, Standard Brands made an offer for the outstanding shares of Planters, offering $105 per share. The suit was moved from Federal District Court to a Pennsylvania state court, by which time Standard Brands had increased its holdings to 75% of Planters' stock. Ultimately, a settlement was reached where Standard Brands agreed to pay an additional amount of $1,143,500 to the trustees on top of the initial $12 million, giving Standard Brands control of 171,577 of the 229,667 shares of Planters. The total amount paid for the shares Standard Brands now controlled was nearly $20 million. Some stockholders still held out against the merger of Planters into Standard Brands, claiming that the shares were worth $160 each, not the $105 Standard was offering, but their suit against Standard was dismissed on February 21, 1962.

In 1981, Standard Brands merged with Nabisco Brands, which was acquired by Kraft Foods in 2000. Kraft subsequently merged with the H.J. Heinz Company to form Kraft Heinz in 2015.

In February 2021, Kraft Heinz announced it would be selling Planters and its other nuts businesses to Hormel for $3.35 billion. The transaction was completed on June 7.

== Slogans ==
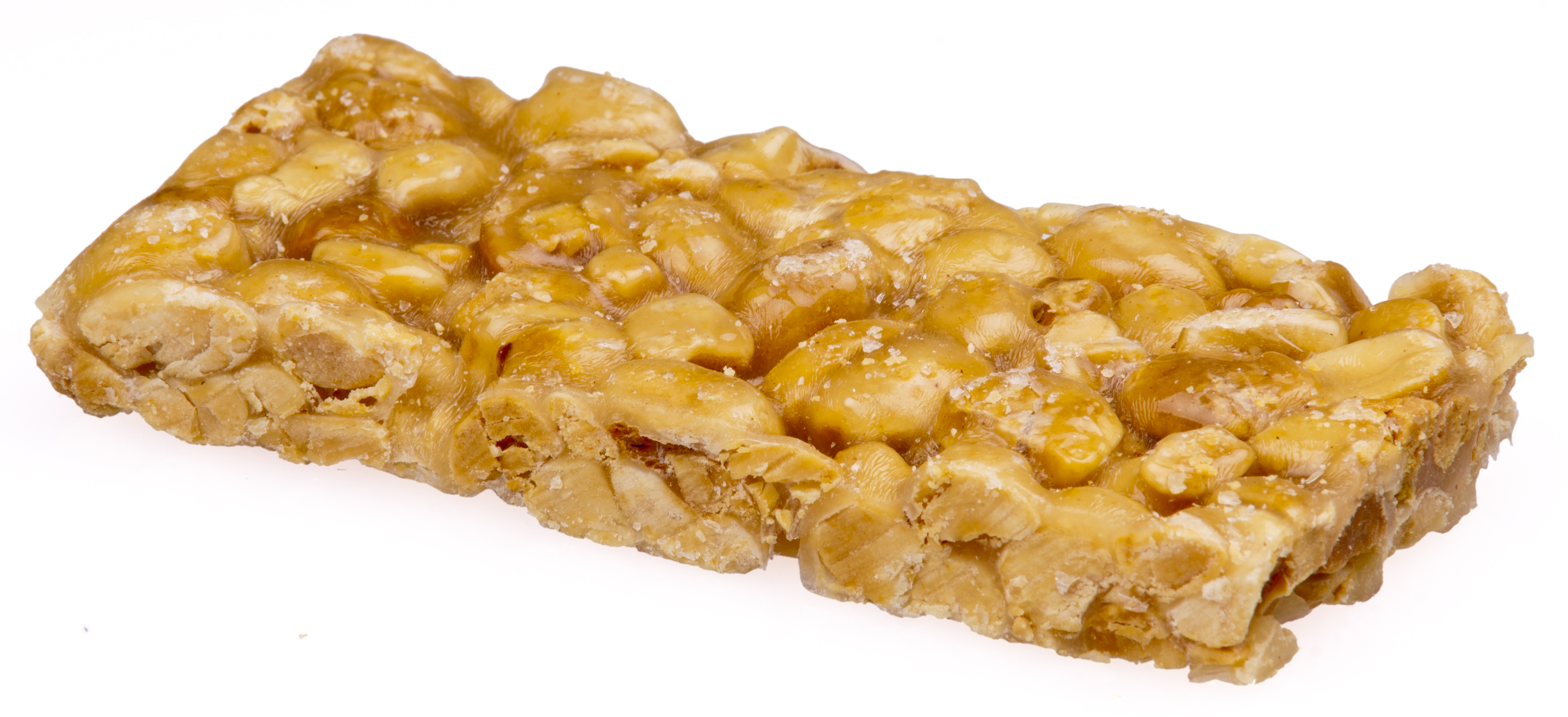
Planters Peanut Bar

Advertising taglines have included:

- "The Nickel Lunch!" – peanuts/peanut bars (1930s–1940s)
- "Planters is the word for (good) Peanuts" (Various products – 1950s)
- "America is Nuts for Planters" (1970s)
- "Everybody Loves a Nut!" (1990s)
- "Peanut butter with a crunch" (P.B. Crisps – 1992)
- "Relax. Go Nuts." (Deluxe Mixed Nuts – 1997)
- "Put Out the Good Stuff" (Various products – 2003-2008)
- "Instinctively Good" (Various products – 2007)
- "Naturally Remarkable" (Various products – 2011)
- "Deliciously NUT-RITIOUS" (UK range – 2016)
- "Harness the Power of the Peanut"
- "A Nut Above" (2021)
- "Become One With the Nut"
- "It's Nuts How Good They Are"
- "The Power is in the Peanut"

== Products ==
A container of Planters Dry Roasted Peanuts

- Cheez Balls (discontinued and reintroduced in 2018, now discontinued and no longer listed on their website)
- Cheez Curls (discontinued and reintroduced in 2018, now discontinued and no longer listed on their website)
- Cocktail Peanuts
- Cooking oil
- CornNuts (acquired in late 1990s)
- Chocolate Covered Cashews
- Dry Roasted Peanuts
- Dry Roasted Sunflower kernels
- Honey Roasted Peanuts
- Honey Roasted Cashews
- Hot Peanuts
- Mixed Nuts
- NUT-rition Heart Healthy Mix
- Salted Cashews
- Salted Peanuts
- Salted Redskin Spanish Peanuts
- Tavern Nuts (discontinued and reintroduced in 2009)
- Smoked Almonds
- Peanut Butter
- Potato Chips
- Salted Caramel Peanuts
- Cocoa Peanuts
- Chipotle Peanuts
- Chili and Lime Peanuts
- Sea Salt and Vinegar
- Heat Peanuts
- Smoked Peanuts
- Sweet N' Crunchy Peanuts
- Nut Clusters
- Sweet N' Spicy

=== Discontinued ===
- Jumbo Block Peanut Candy (presumably discontinued)
- Coconut Balls
- Corn Chips
- P.B. Crackers
- P.B. Crisps (introduced in 1992)
- Peanut Butter Chocolates
- Peanut Bar
- Peanut Butter candies
- Peanut Butter Fudge Cookies
- Onion Peanuts
- Garlic Peanuts
- Dry Roasted Cashews
- Dry Roasted Peanuts (original version)

== International ==
Planters products in Canada, including Planters peanut butter, are made by Johnvince Foods (JVF Canada), who licenses the trademark from Kraft Canada (now Hormel foods).

== Vegan and vegetarian concerns ==
Some Planters nut products (such as their larger-sized jars of peanuts) contain gelatin, making them unsuitable for vegetarians or vegans.
