= Rah (slang) =

British slang for a young upper-class person

Rah or yah is a pejorative term referring to a stereotypical affluent young upper class or upper-middle class person in the United Kingdom. It originated as a contraction of "Hoorah Henry" (sometimes "Hoorah Henries and Henriettas"), a pejorative description of a social stereotype similar to the Sloane Ranger stereotype also recognised in the UK, though a rah is generally younger, typically around university age (18–25), and less associated geographically with London. The use of rah is likely to have been furthered by onomatopoeic correlation with the way in which those fitting the stereotype are perceived to talk, with the term being associated with upper-middle class affluence since at least the early 1980s. An important feature of the rah stereotype is the enjoyment of an affluent or party lifestyle with excessive financial assistance from their parents.

At St Andrews and Edinburgh, the term more frequently used is yah. The use of yah is, similarly, likely to have been furthered by a perceived and much-parodied upper-class pronunciation of the word year in the phrase "gap year".

== Characteristics of the stereotype ==
Rahs stereotypically study at prestigious institutions such as Russell Group universities, having previously attended a private boarding or day school, or sometimes a grammar school or faith school in an affluent area. Another stereotype is that rahs have taken a gap year, usually in Africa, South America or Southeast Asia.

Certain clothing is often associated with rahs. Mid-market names such as Jack Wills and Tom's Trunks are common. For girls, pashminas, jodhpurs, Ugg boots, flares and cable-knit jumpers, combined with scruffy hair arranged in a bun or drastic side partings, are common. Boys are stereotyped with chinos, board shorts, boat shoes and sports-team clothing. Gilets (usually Schöffel), quilted jackets, jogging bottoms, sunglasses and flip-flops are common for both sexes. In colder seasons, country attire and outdoor wear is popular, especially brands such as Hunter Boot and J. Barbour & Sons.

Rugby union and cricket are popular for male rahs. Other sports such as skiing, sailing, rowing, tennis, rugby fives, Eton fives, canoeing, fencing, lacrosse, polo, shooting and yachting are also popular.

== In popular culture ==
- The Gap Yah sketch, by The Unexpected Items, features a typical rah
- Made in Chelsea
- The Elvis Presley song "Poison Ivy League", performed in the 1964 movie Roustabout, contains the term rah-rah boys in several verses

== See also ==
- American prep
- Soc subculture
- Popular clique
