= Schöffel =

Schöffel or Schoffel may refer to:

- Schöffel (company), a German clothing company
- Louis A. Schoffel (1894–1946), American lawyer, politician, and judge from New York
- Martin Schöffel (born 1977), German politician
