= Social class in the United Kingdom =

Social structure of British society

The social structure of the United Kingdom has historically been highly influenced by the concept of social class, which continues to affect British society today. British society, like its European neighbours and most societies in world history, was traditionally (before the Industrial Revolution) divided hierarchically within a system that involved the hereditary transmission of occupation, social status and political influence. Since the advent of industrialisation, this system has been in a constant state of revision, and new factors other than birth (for example, education) are now a greater part of creating identity in Britain.

Although the country's definitions of social class vary and are highly controversial, most are influenced by factors of wealth, occupation, and education. Until the Life Peerages Act 1958, the Parliament of the United Kingdom was organised on a class basis, with the House of Lords representing the hereditary upper class and the House of Commons representing everybody else. The British monarch is usually viewed as being at the top of the social class structure.

British society has experienced significant change since the Second World War, including an expansion of higher education and home ownership, a shift towards a service-dominated economy, mass immigration, a changing role for women and a more individualistic culture. These changes have had a considerable impact on the social landscape. However, claims that the UK has become a classless society have frequently been met with scepticism. Research has shown that social status in the United Kingdom is influenced by, although separate from, social class.

This change in terminology corresponded to a general decrease in significance ascribed to hereditary characteristics, and increase in the significance of wealth and income as indicators of position in the social hierarchy.

The "class system" in the United Kingdom is widely studied in academia but no definition of the word class is universally agreed to. Some scholars may adopt the Marxist view of class where persons are classified by their relationship to means of production, as owners or as workers, which is the most important factor in that person's social rank. Alternatively, Max Weber developed a three-component theory of stratification under which "a person's power can be shown in the social order through their status, in the economic order through their class, and in the political order through their party. The biggest current study of social class in the United Kingdom is the Great British Class Survey. Besides these academic models, there are myriad popular explanations of class in Britain. In her work Class, Jilly Cooper quotes a shopkeeper on the subject of bacon: "When a woman asks for back I call her 'madam'; when she asks for streaky I call her 'dear'."

== History ==
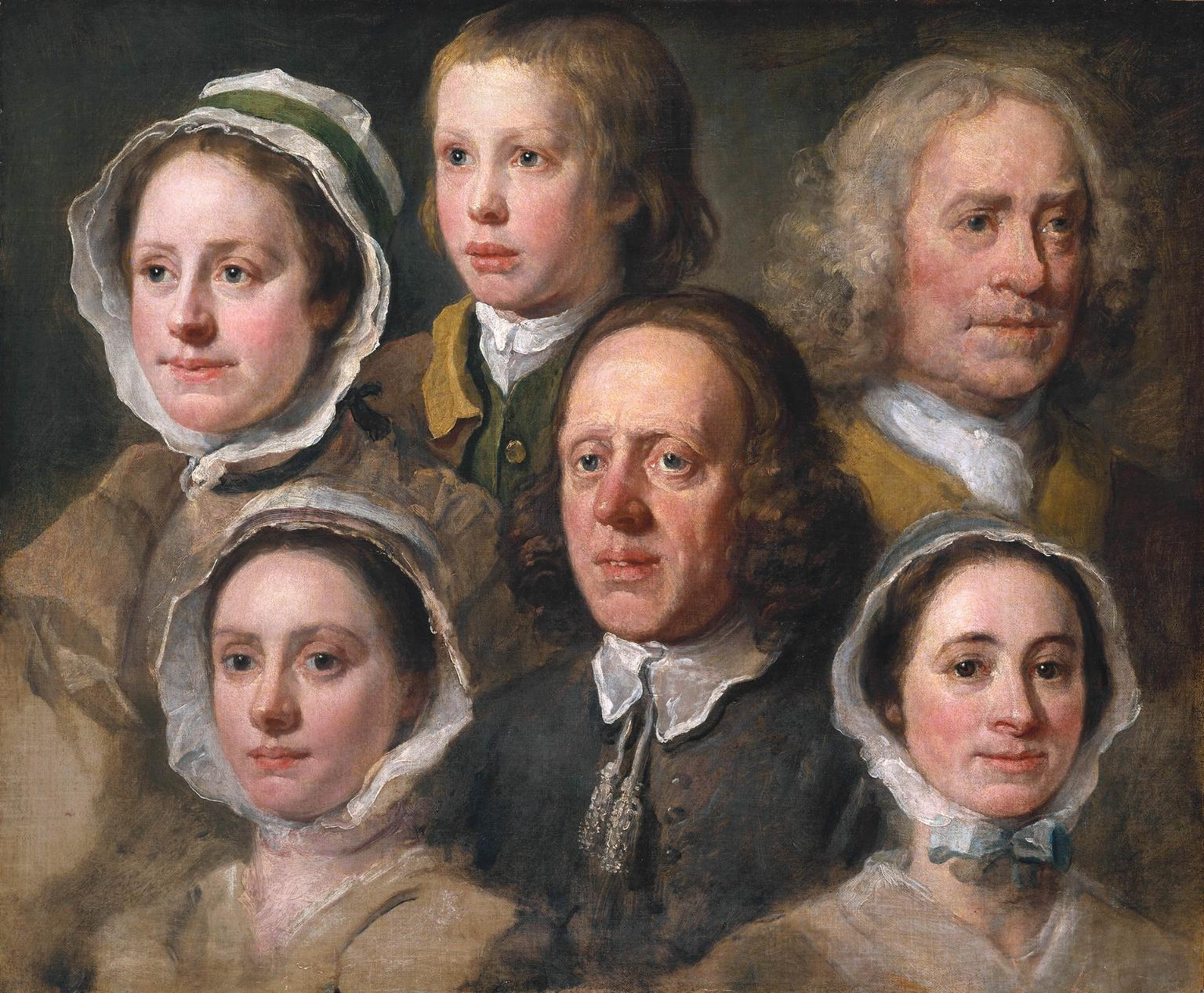
Hogarth's Servants, painting by William Hogarth of six of his servants

In 1485, virtually all the English men and women were Roman Catholics. All were taught to believe that God created the universe and ordered it and was active in its daily workings. In other words, the world was a physical manifestation of God's will. There was no room for coincidence or accident. Educated English men and women had many ways of describing how the world was supposed to be, most of them metaphorical. One of their favorite metaphors was that of the body politic or viewing their nation as the human body. The king was the head; the aristocracy the arms and shoulders; the tenant farmers and poor the legs and feet, etc. The beauty of this metaphor was that it conveyed that all parts of the body politic contributed equally to the common good but were not equal in status: if the arms or legs attempted to usurp the head, chaos would ensue. This train of thought would later become known as the Great Chain of Being in which all inhabitants of the universe, in hierarchal order, went: God, then Angels, then Man, then Animals, then Plants, then Stones, then the Damned. Each of the ranks were further subdivided into smaller hierarchies. For the category Man, the order, from highest to lowest was; King, nobles, gentlemen, yeomen, husbandmen, cottagers, and laborers.

The United Kingdom never experienced the sudden dispossession of the estates of the nobility, which occurred in much of Europe after the French Revolution or in the early 20th century, the British nobility, in so far as it existed as a distinct social class, integrated itself with those with new wealth derived from commercial and industrial sources more comfortably than in most of Europe. Opportunities resulting from consistent economic growth and the expanding British Empire also enabled some from much poorer backgrounds (generally men who had managed to acquire some education) to rise through the class system.

The historian David Cannadine sees the period around 1880 as a peak after which the position of the old powerful families declined rapidly, from a number of causes, reaching a nadir in the years after the Second World War, symbolised by the widespread destruction of country houses. However, their wealth, if not their political power, has rebounded strongly since the 1980s, benefiting from greatly increased values of the land and fine art which many owned in quality.

Meanwhile, the complex British middle classes had also been enjoying a long period of growth and increasing prosperity, and achieving political power at the national level to a degree unusual in Europe. They avoided the strict stratification of many Continental middle classes, and formed a large and amorphous group closely connected at their edges with both the gentry and aristocracy and the labouring classes. In particular the great financial centre of the City of London was open to outsiders to an unusual degree, and continually expanding and creating new employment.

The British working class, on the other hand, was not notable in Europe for prosperity, and early modern British travellers often remarked on the high standard of living of the farmworkers and artisans of the Netherlands, though the peasantry in other countries such as France were remarked on as poorer than their English equivalents. Living standards certainly improved greatly over the period, more so in England than other parts of the United Kingdom, but the Industrial Revolution was marked by extremely harsh working conditions and poor housing until about the middle of the 19th century.

== Formal classifications ==
=== Early modern ===
At the time of the formation of Great Britain in 1707, England and Scotland had similar class-based social structures. Some basic categories covering most of the British population around 1500 to 1700 are as follows.

Class	Characteristics
Cottager or labourer; servant	Cottagers were a step below husbandmen, in that they had to work for others for wages. Lowest order of the working castes; perhaps vagabonds, drifters, criminals or other outcasts would be lower. Slavery in England died out by 1200 AD, so in feudal times this would have been the villein or serf. Most young women of middle and lower ranks became servants to neighboring families for a few years before marriage. Servants in husbandry were unmarried men hired on annual contracts as farm workers.
Husbandman (or other tradesmen)	A tradesman or farmer who either rented a home or owned very little land was a husbandman. In feudal times, this person likely would have been a peasant, either as a serf who paid a large portion of his work or produce to the land-holding lord or more likely as a freeman who paid a rent in cash rather than in labour.
Yeoman	The yeoman class generally included small farmers who held a reasonable amount of land and were able to protect themselves from neighbouring lords et cetera. They played a military role as longbowmen before 1500. The village shopkeeper was placed between yeoman and gentry in the modern social hierarchy. Sir Anthony Richard Wagner, Garter Principal King of Arms, wrote that "a Yeoman would not normally have less than 100 acres" (40 hectares) "and in social status is one step down from the Landed Gentry, but above, say, a husbandman."
Professional and businessman	Urban professionals included lawyers, with the highest status going to the London barristers and the Inns of Court. Physicians were rising in status as professionalisation and education built upon rapidly increasing knowledge bases. Merchants and businessmen could range in status from middle to high, depending on their wealth and importance. For higher social prestige, they would buy a landed estate or negotiate for a knighthood or a baronetcy.
Clergy	Clergy were mostly located in rural areas, where they were under the direction of the gentry. A bishop had the status of nobility, and sat in the House of Lords, but his son did not inherit the title.
Gentry/gentleman	The gentry by definition held enough assets to live on land rents without working, and so could be well-educated. If they worked it was in law, as priests, in politics, or in other educated pursuits without manual labour. The term Esquire was used for landowners who were not knighted, a term which later became Squire and referred to as the Squirarchy. They typically possessed estates worked by tenants and laborers. It was prestigious to purchase a military or naval commission for a likely son.
Knight	The role of knighthood was very important in the medieval period, with the role of organising local military forces on behalf of a senior noble. However, by 1600 the title was an honorific one, often granted to outstanding combat soldiers in the king's army.
Baronet (hereditary, non-peer)	A baronet held a hereditary style of knighthood, giving the highest rank below a peerage.
Aristocracy: Peer (Noble)	Further subdivided into Dukes, Marquesses, Earls, Viscounts, and Baron (from most notable to the least). The rules of succession were elaborate; usually, however, the eldest son inherited the title and the wealth. When the male line expired, so too did the title (but the family kept the land). The peers were generally large land holders, often also owning a house in London. They sat in the House of Lords and often played a role in court. Ireland and Scotland had entirely separate aristocracies; their nobles sat in their own parliaments but not in the English House of Lords.
Royal	A member of the royal family, a prince, or a close relative of the queen or the king. The King was the ruler of the kingdom, God's lieutenant on earth and the owner of 5% of the land.

=== Early capitalism ===
This social period lasts from the end of the 17th century to the 20th century. At this point society goes from being feudal to capitalist, due to the regime change after the Glorious Revolution.

Class	Characteristics
Working class	The majority of the population, they were mainly farmers and factory workers. These lived in terrible conditions and without a minimum wage.
Bourgeoisie	Although they did not have a title nor were they descended from anyone with a title, they did have their own privileges and wealth once they had earned a living, although the former were a lesser value than the nobles. Still, they became ruling class around these times. And they also had almost the same jobs as their aristocratic counterparts.
Nobility	In these times they were people with honorary titles that provided them with different legal or private privileges; the class ranged from the royal family to the gentry. They performed different roles such as politicians, scientists, sports, commercial, financial and even in the rural environment as landowners.

=== 20th century ===
The social grade classification created by the National Readership Survey over 50 years ago achieved widespread usage during the 20th century in marketing and government reports and statistics.

Grade	Occupation
A	Higher managerial, administrative or professional
B	Intermediate managerial, administrative or professional
C1	Supervisory or clerical and junior managerial, administrative or professional
C2	Skilled manual workers
D	Semi and unskilled manual workers
E	Casual or lowest grade workers, pensioners and others who depend on the state for their income

=== 21st century ===
The UK Office for National Statistics (ONS) produced a new socio-economic classification in 2001. The reason was to provide a more comprehensive and detailed classification to take newer employment patterns into account.

Group	Description	NRS equivalent
1	Higher professional and managerial occupations	A
2	Lower managerial and professional occupations	B
3	Intermediate occupations	C1 and C2
4	Small employers and own account workers	C1 and C2
5	Lower supervisory and technical occupations	C1 and C2
6	Semi-routine occupations	D
7	Routine occupations	D
8	Never worked and long-term unemployed	E

=== Great British Class Survey ===
On 2 April 2013 analysis of the results of a survey, which was conducted by the BBC in 2011 and developed in collaboration with academic experts, was published online in the journal Sociology. The results released were based on a survey of 160,000 residents of the United Kingdom most of whom lived in England and described themselves as "white." Class was defined and measured according to the amount and kind of economic, cultural, and social resources, "capitals", reported. Economic capital was defined as income and assets; cultural capital as amount and type of cultural interests and activities, and social capital as the quantity and social status of their friends, family and personal and business contacts. This theoretical framework was inspired by that of Pierre Bourdieu, who published his theory of social distinction in 1979.

==== Results ====
Analysis of the survey revealed seven classes: a wealthy "elite;" a prosperous salaried "middle class" consisting of professionals and managers; a class of technical experts; a class of "new affluent" workers, and at the lower levels of the class structure, in addition to an ageing traditional working class, a "precariat" characterised by very low levels of capital, and a group of emergent service workers. The fracturing of the middle sectors of the social structure into distinguishable factions separated by generational, economic, cultural, and social characteristics was considered notable by the authors of the research.

===== Elite =====
Members of the elite class are the top 6% of British society with very high economic capital (particularly savings), high social capital, and very 'highbrow' cultural capital. Occupations such as chief executive officers, IT and telecommunications directors, marketing and sales directors; functional managers and directors, solicitors, barristers and judges, financial managers, doctors teaching in higher education, dentists, medical doctors and advertising and public relations directors were strongly represented. However, those in the established and 'acceptable' professions, such as academia, law and medicine are more traditional upper middle class identifiers, with IT and sales being the preserve of the economic if not social middle class.

===== Established middle class =====
Members of the established middle class, about 25% of British society, reported high economic capital, high status of mean social contacts, and both high highbrow and high emerging cultural capital. Well-represented occupations included electrical engineers, occupational therapists, social workers, midwives, registered nurses, environmental professionals, quality assurance and regulatory professionals, town planning officials, and special needs teaching professionals.

===== Technical middle class =====
The technical middle class, about 6% of British society, shows high economic capital, very high status of social contacts, but relatively few contacts reported, and moderate cultural capital. Occupations represented include medical radiographers, aircraft pilots, pharmacists, natural and social science professionals and physical scientists, and business, research, and administrative positions.

===== New affluent workers =====
New affluent workers, about 15% of British society, show moderately good economic capital, relatively poor status of social contacts, though highly varied, and moderate highbrow but good emerging cultural capital. Occupations include electricians and electrical fitters; postal workers; retail cashiers and checkout operatives; plumbers and heating and ventilation technicians; sales and retail assistants; housing officers; kitchen and catering assistants; quality assurance technicians.

===== Traditional working class =====
The traditional working class, about 14% of British society, shows relatively poor economic capital, but some housing assets, few social contacts, and low highbrow and emerging cultural capital. Typical occupations include electrical and electronics technicians; care workers; cleaners; van drivers; electricians; residential, day, and domiciliary care.

===== Emergent service sector =====
The emergent service sector, about 19% of British society, shows relatively poor economic capital, but reasonable household income, moderate social contacts, high emerging (but low highbrow) cultural capital. Typical occupations include bar staff, chefs, nursing auxiliaries and assistants, assemblers and routine operatives, care workers, elementary storage occupations, customer service occupations, and musicians.

===== Precariat =====
The precariat, about 15% of British society, shows poor economic capital, and the lowest scores on every other criterion. Although some members of this class are unemployed, many hold jobs. Members of this class include about 6% of all cleaners, 5% of all van drivers, 4% of all care workers, 4% of all carpenters and joiners, 3% of all caretakers, 3% of all leisure and travel service occupations, 3% of all shopkeepers and proprietors, and 2% of all retail cashiers.

== Informal classifications ==
=== Underclass ===
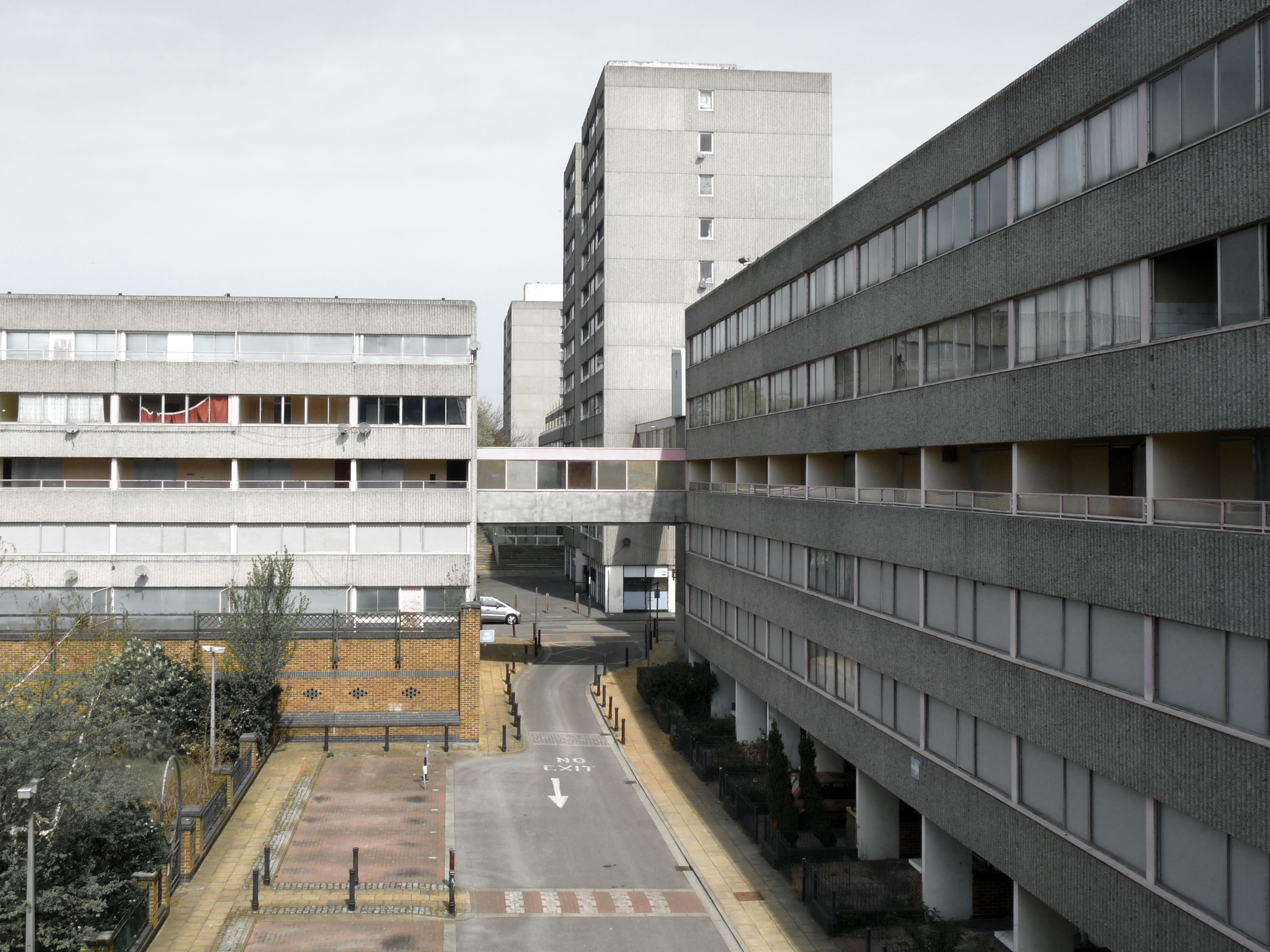
Many unemployed people rely on National Insurance/social security benefits and are housed in social housing, such as council estates.

The term "underclass" is used to refer to those people who are "chronically unemployed", and in many instances have been for generations. The term was invented in the US in the late 20th century. Evidence could not be found through field research to support the notion of an 'underclass' with a separate sub-culture amongst the long-term unemployed, yet it has become a key word in the British lexicon due to the essays that the American New-Right sociologist Charles Murray was invited to write in 1989 for The Sunday Times.

Keith J. Hayward and Majid Yar, criminologists at the University of Kent, contend that there are shared meanings and connotations between the term "underclass" and the pejorative word "chav" in media discourses, with the difference being that while underclass implies a perceived "pathology" of the relationship between the working class and production, chav implies a pathology of their relationship to consumption and consumer culture, and that, "in contrast to previous commentaries on underclass groups, 'chavs' are no longer viewed as a stratum of the population who have chosen to reject or invert mainstream aspirations or desires. Instead the 'new British underclass' are increasingly understood as 'flawed consumers', unable or unwilling to make the 'right' type of consumer choice."

Educational special adviser Charlie Taylor followed Michael Gove in conceiving of an "educational underclass", and felt the majority of those involved in the 2011 England riots could be considered to be members. BBC journalist Mark Easton felt that, in the justificatory responses he heard in the aftermath of those riots, it would be easy to concur with the politician Iain Duncan Smith's 2008 theory of "an underclass" that exhibited "creeping expansion".

=== Working class ===
==== Unskilled and semi-skilled working class ====
Traditionally, these people would have worked as manual labourers. They would typically have left school as soon as legally permissible and not have been able to take part in higher education.

Many would go on to work in semi-skilled and unskilled jobs in raw materials extraction/processing, in assembly and in machine shops of Britain's major car factories, steel mills, coal mines, foundries and textile mills in the highly industrialised cities and pit towns and villages in the West Midlands, North of England, South Wales and the Scottish Lowlands. However, since the mid-1970s and early-1980s, some might contend that de-industrialisation has shattered many of these communities, resulting, some might contend, in a complete deterioration in quality of life and a reversal in rising living standards for the industrial working class. Many either dropped in status to the working poor or fell into permanent reliance on welfare dependence. Some dropped out altogether and joined the black market economy, while a few managed, often through geographic fortune of other industries in the local area, to ascend to the lower middle class.

It has been argued that with the decline in manufacturing and increase in the service sector, lower-paid office workers are effectively working-class. Call centres in particular, have sprung up in former centres of industry. However, since the early-2000s, there has been a trend for many call centres to close down in the UK and outsource their jobs to India and other jurisdictions, as part of cost-cutting measures.

The Mosaic 2010 groups where the proportion of residents in NRS social grade D was rated "high" in the 2010 Mosaic Index are "Residents with sufficient incomes in right-to-buy social housing" and "Families in low-rise social housing with high levels of benefit need".

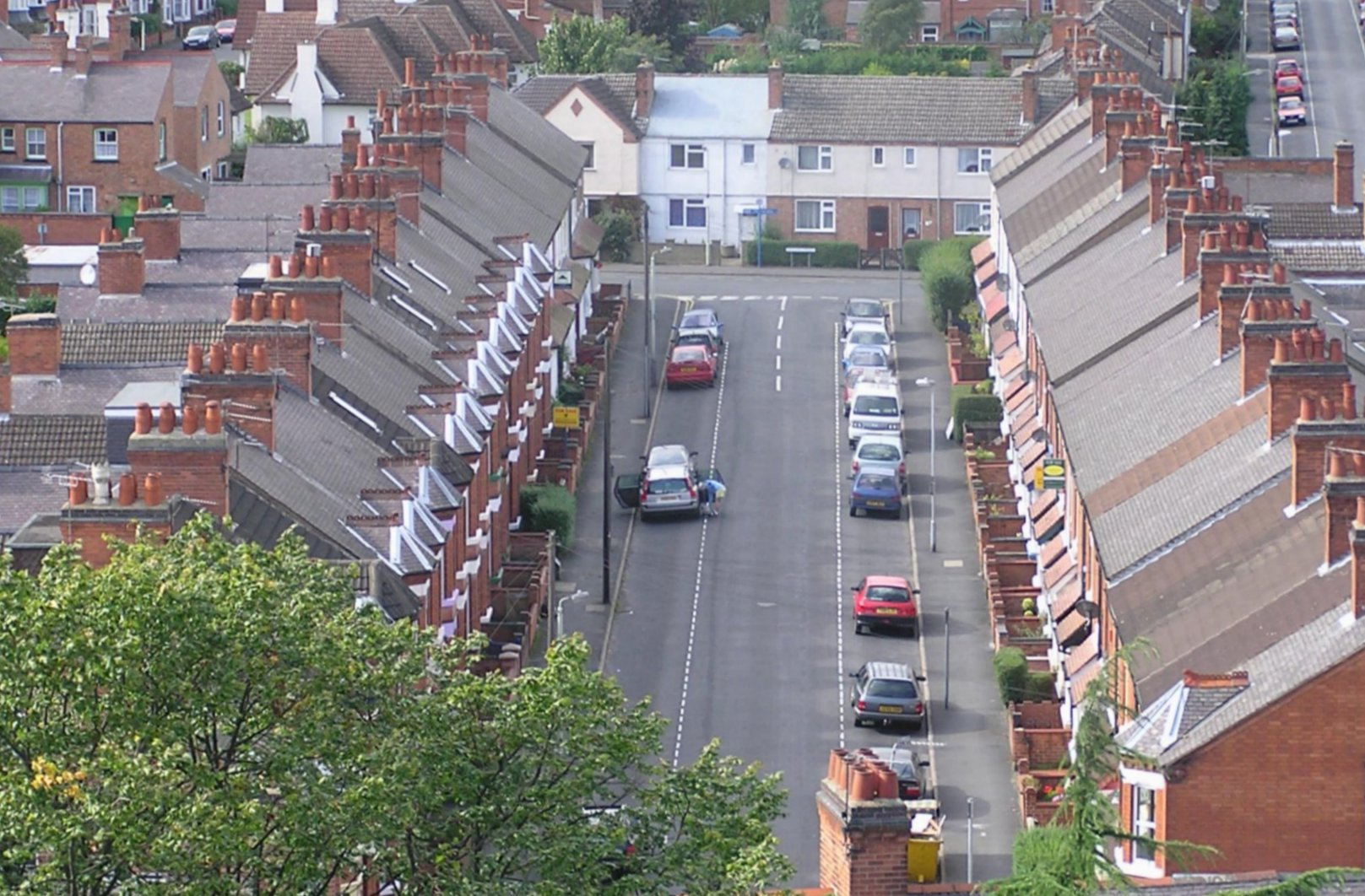
Terraced housing in Loughborough, built for the Victorian working classes

During the post-war era, white working-class Britons witnessed a big rise in their standard of living. As noted by Denys Blakeway in 2008:

"The white working-class have prospered hugely since the war. They have experienced unparalleled growth in disposable income and today they are now richer than their parents and grandparents could ever have imagined. There are shared values in white working-class culture but I think it is incredibly difficult to put your finger on exactly what it is that defines "white working-class" because a lot of them are shared by the middle class, such as football and the pub."

==== Skilled working class ====
This class of people would be in skilled industrial jobs or tradesmen, traditionally in the construction and manufacturing industry, but in recent decades showing entrepreneurial development as the stereotypical white van man, or self-employed contractors. These people would speak in regional accents and have completed craft apprenticeships rather than a university education. The only Mosaic 2010 group where the proportion of residents in NRS social grade C2 was rated "high" in the 2010 Mosaic Index is "Residents with sufficient incomes in right-to-buy social housing".

An example of what the BBC described as a "normal, working-class Boltonian" was Fred Dibnah, a small-scale company director in the construction industry (and therefore also an example of the small employer class, rather than the routine class, in NS-SEC). A fictional example of a mid-century skilled working man, from the literary traditional of the working-class novel, is Arthur Seaton, in the novel Saturday Night and Sunday Morning. A lathe operator at a bicycle factory, he regards his father's apparently subservient generation with contempt, and at the close of the novel (made explicit in the film version) plans to buy his own home.

=== Middle class ===
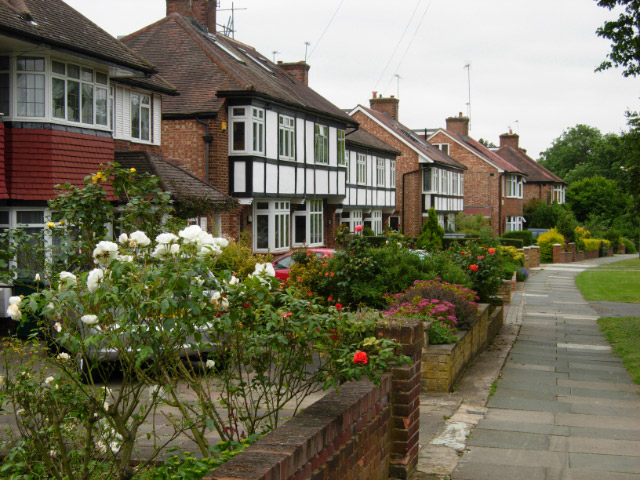
A suburban street in Mill Hill, London, built for the middle classes

==== Lower middle class ====
The British lower middle class, when described historically, primarily consisted of office workers: when describing class segregation of housing in the Nottingham of 1901, clerks, bookkeepers, estate agents and teachers are described as having been lower middle class. Researchers today sometimes equate NRS social grade C1, "Supervisory, clerical and junior managerial, administrative and professional", with "lower middle class".

In the nineteenth century, the middle and lower middle classes were able to live in suburbs due to the development of horse-drawn omnibuses and railways. One radical Liberal politician (Charles Masterman), writing in 1909 used "the Middle Classes" and "the suburbans" synonymously. In the early twenty-first century, there were no Mosaic 2010 geodemographic groups where the proportion of residents in NRS social grade C1 was rated as "high" or "low" in the 2010 Index; it was rated as "average" in all Mosaic groups, whether these were of a suburban, rural, city or small-town nature.

Some researchers conceive of the lower middle class as consisting of those who work in lower-grade service-sector managerial jobs or semi-professions (the lower-grade service class in Oesch 2006) and small business owners. Prior to the expansion in higher education from the 1960s onwards, members of this class generally did not have a university education.

Members of the lower middle class typically speak in local accents, although relatively mild. Votes in this area are split and minority parties will have a stronger proportion.

==== Middle class ====
The middle class in Britain often consists of people with tertiary education and may have been educated at either state or private schools.

Typical jobs include: accountants, architects, solicitors, surveyors, social workers, teachers, managers, specialist IT workers, engineers, bankers, doctors, nurses and civil servants.

The middle class, at least in the 19th Century, had a more secure income than the working class and accumulated unspent income which they could channel into investments.

Members of the middle class are often politically and socially engaged (a Mori poll in 2005 found 70% of grades AB voted at the 2005 general election compared to 54% of grades DE). Education is greatly valued by the middle classes: they will make every effort to ensure their children get offered a place at university; they may send their children to a private school, employ a home tutor for out of school hours so their child learns at a faster rate, or go to great lengths to get their children enrolled into good state or selective grammar schools; such as moving house into the catchment area.

They also value culture and make up a significant proportion of the book-buying and theatre-going public. They typically read broadsheet newspapers rather than tabloids. The only Mosaic 2010 geodemographic type where the proportion of residents in NRS social grade B was rated as "high" in the 2010 index was "People living in brand new residential developments". The middle classes particularly of England and Wales are often popularly referred to as "Middle England". Jilly Cooper is a self-described "upper middle-class" writer who wrote an extended humour sketch imagining the lives of different types of people drawing on prejudiced tropes and biases relating to social class, which she called "Class, A view from Middle England".

==== Upper middle class ====
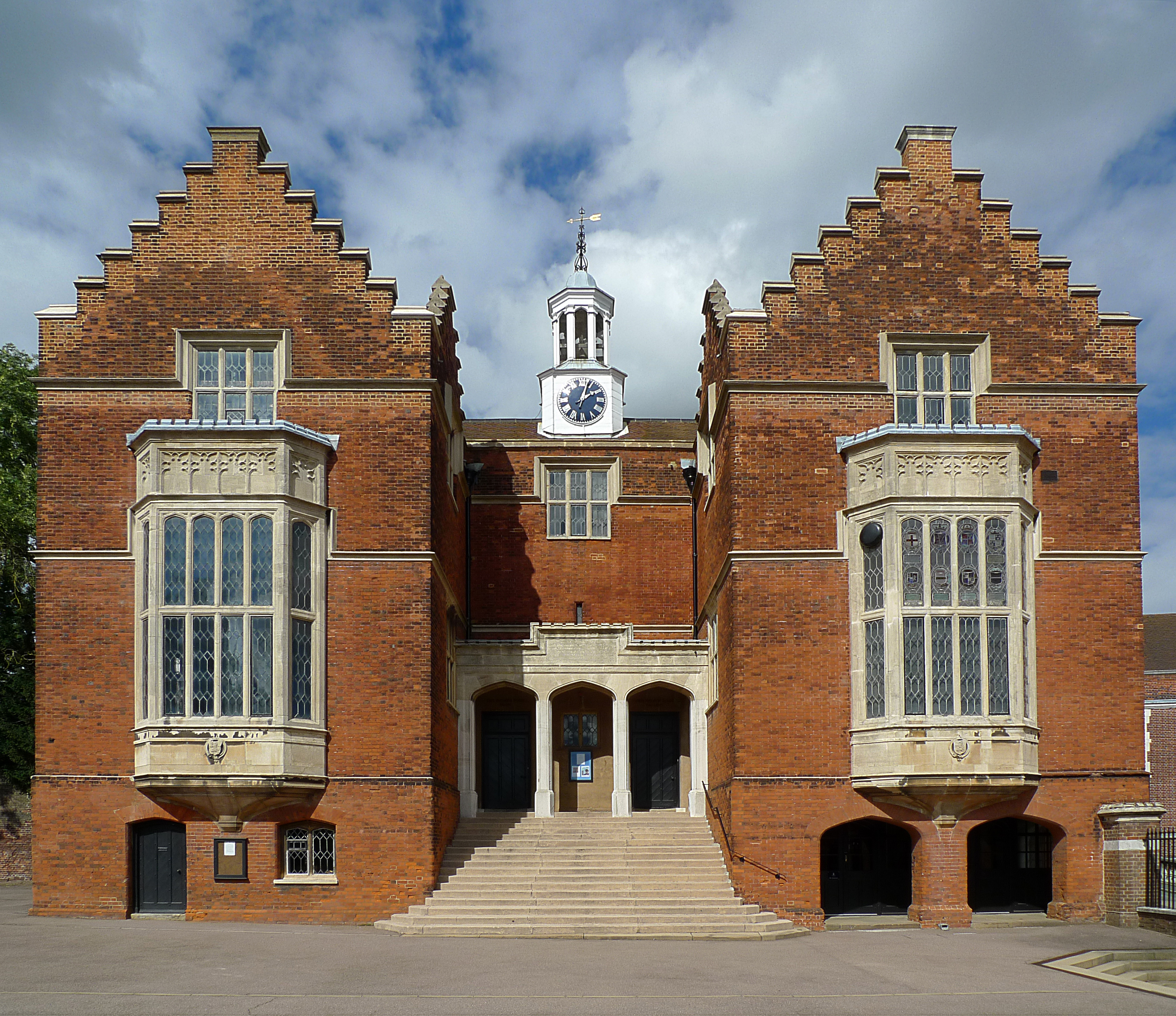
Harrow School. The public school is traditionally one of the key institutions of the upper middle class in Britain.

The upper middle class in Britain broadly consists of people who were born into families which have traditionally possessed high incomes, although this group is defined more by family background than by job or income. Although RP is not exclusive to any social class, some members of this stratum, in England, traditionally used General British Pronunciation natively.

The upper middle class are traditionally educated at private schools, preferably one of the "major" or "minor" "public schools" which themselves often have pedigrees going back for hundreds of years and charge fees of as much as £44,000 per year per pupil (as of 2022).

A minority of upper-middle-class families may also have ancestry that directly connects them to the upper classes. Armorial bearings in the form of an escutcheon may denote such past status. A lesser status historically directly relevant to the upper middle class is that of squire or lord of the manor; however, these property rights are no longer prevalent.

Although such categorisations are not precise, popular contemporary examples of upper-middle-class people may include Boris Johnson, Catherine, Princess of Wales, David Cameron, Theresa May and Matthew Pinsent (athlete).

=== Upper class ===
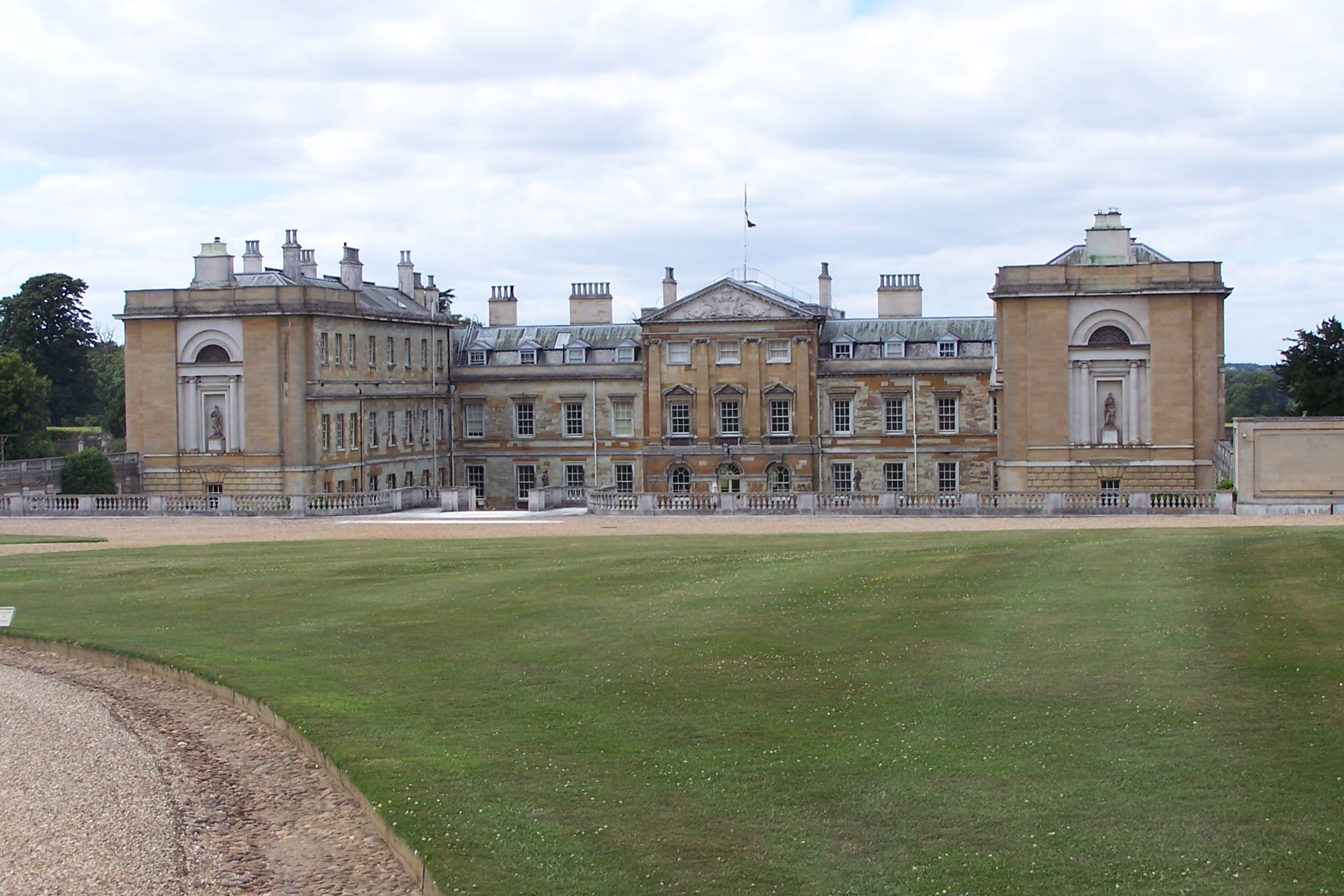
Woburn Abbey, family seat of the Duke of Bedford

The British "upper class" is a very small proportion of the population and consists of the peerage, gentry and hereditary landowners, among others. Peers are those in possession of a hereditary title (a dukedom, a marquessate, an earldom, a viscountcy, or a barony), whereas Gentry are those descended from peers but who themselves do not hold a title. A baronetcy, despite being a hereditary title, does not confer peerage to its holder, though its holders are considered the highest level of minor nobility. Those in possession or right to a coat of arms are typically at least members of the upper middle class.

Traditionally, upper class children were brought up at home by a nanny for the first few years of their lives, and then home schooled by private tutors. From the late-nineteenth century, it became increasingly popular for upper-class families to mimic the middle classes in sending their children to privately run public schools, which had been predominantly founded to serve the educational needs of the middle class.

Nowadays, when children are old enough, they may attend a prep school or pre-preparatory school. Moving into secondary education, it is still commonplace for upper-class children to attend a privately run public school, although it is not unheard of for certain families to send their children to state schools. Continuing education goals can vary from family to family; it may, in part, be based on the educational history of the family. In the past, both the British Army and Royal Navy have been the institutions of choice. Equally, the clergy, as well as academia, particularly within the arts and humanities divisions of Britain's oldest and most prestigious universities (Oxbridge), have been traditional career paths amongst the upper class - indeed until 1840 the majority of Oxbridge graduates were destined for ordination.

== Sociolinguistics of Great Britain ==
Back home, [the English girl from Little Sodbury] opened her mouth and out came her birthplace, her parents' occupation and salary, her schooling and her social aspirations. Back home, her accent was, if anything, as much of a drawback as halitosis.

— "English Girls in New York: They Don't Go Home Again", New York, 1971

=== Received Pronunciation ===
Received Pronunciation, also known as RP or BBC English, was a term introduced as way of defining standard English, but the accent has acquired a certain prestige from being associated with the middle (and above) classes in the South East, the wealthiest part of England. Use of RP by people from the "regions" outside the South East can be indicative of a certain educational background, such as public school or elocution lessons.

"The Queen's English" or "King's English" was once a synonym for RP. However, Queen Elizabeth II, King Charles III, and some other older members of the aristocracy are now perceived as speaking, or having spoken, in a way that is both more old-fashioned and higher class than "general" RP. Phoneticians call this accent "Conservative Received Pronunciation". The Queen's pronunciation, however, also changed over the years. The results of the Harrington & al. study can be interpreted either as a change, in a range not normally perceptible, in the direction of the mainstream RP of a reference corpus of 1980s newsreaders, or showing subtle changes that might well have been influenced by the vowels of Estuary English.

BBC English was also a synonym for RP; people seeking a career in acting or broadcasting once learnt RP as a matter of course if they did not speak it already. However, the BBC and other broadcasters are now much more willing to use (indeed desire to use) regional accents.

=== U and non-U ===
U	Non-U
Vegetables	Greens
Scent	Perfume
Graveyard	Cemetery
Spectacles	Glasses
False teeth	Dentures
Napkin	Serviette
Sofa	Settee or couch
Lavatory or loo	Toilet
Lunch	Dinner (for midday meal)
Dinner	Tea (for evening meal)
Pudding	Sweet

Language and writing style have consistently been one of the most reliable indicators of class, although pronunciation did not become such an indicator until the late-nineteenth century. The variations between the language employed by the upper classes and non-upper classes have, perhaps, been best documented by linguistics Professor Alan Ross's 1954 article on U and non-U English usage, with "U" representing upper and upper middle class vocabulary of the time, and "Non-U" representing lower middle class vocabulary. The discussion was furthered in Noblesse Oblige and featured contributions from, among others, Nancy Mitford. The debate was revisited in the mid-1970s, in a publication by Debrett's called U and Non-U Revisited. Ross also contributed to this volume, and it is remarkable to notice how little the language (amongst other factors) changed in the passing of a quarter of a century.

=== English regional dialect ===
In England, the upper class or prestige dialect is almost always a form of RP; however, some areas have their "own" prestige dialect, distinct from both RP and the working-class dialect of the region.

England has a wider variety of regional dialects than larger English-speaking countries such as Australia or the United States, and many of England's dialects have working class or lower middle class connotations. However, there is a tradition of linguistic study of dialects in England and many members of the middle classes, such as Alexander John Ellis (author of On Early English Pronunciation, Part V) and Harold Orton (co-founder of the Survey of English Dialects), were fascinated by the linguistics of working-class speech. Arthur Balfour, a 19th-century politician and an aristocrat, gave a large financial donation for the production of the English Dialect Dictionary, compiled by the working-class Joseph Wright.

- Yorkshire dialect, the accent of Yorkshire with some considerable variation between the north, south, east and west of the region.
- Manchester dialect, the accent and dialect of Manchester and the surrounding area.
- Scouse – The accent and dialect of Liverpool, especially strong in Merseyside's working-class population.
- Barrovian, the dialect spoken in Barrow-in-Furness in Cumbria.
- Lancashire dialect refers to the dialect in the traditional county of Lancashire, outside Manchester, Liverpool and Barrow.
- Brummie – The accent and dialect of Birmingham.
- Potteries dialect, the accent and dialect of Stoke-on-Trent and surround Potteries area.
- The Black Country dialect of the West Midlands, which is similar to but distinctive from Brummie.
- Geordie – An accent and dialect of North-East England, particularly the Tyneside area.
- Mackem – An accent and dialect of Sunderland and surrounding areas.
- West Country dialects – a variety of similar, yet noticeably different accents and dialects in the South West of England, such as the Bristolian dialect.
- Cockney is traditionally the working-class accent of East London. It also has distinct variations in grammar and vocabulary.
- The London accent is a more broadly defined working and lower middle class accent than Cockney.
- Estuary English – A working-class and lower middle class accent from South-East England, basically a milder (closer to R.P.) form of the London accent. The term was commonly used in the media in the 1990s, although the media depiction was criticised by academics such as Peter Roach and Peter Trudgill and the term is now less common. In this region, there was previously Essex dialect, Kentish dialect, Sussex dialect and Surrey dialect, but these are now rarely heard except amongst very elderly residents.
- Mockney is a term used in popular media for a deliberate affectation of the working-class London (Cockney) accent by middle-class people to gain "street credibility". However, phoneticians regard the infusion of Cockney features into Received Pronunciation among younger speakers to be a natural process.
- Multicultural London English (abbreviated MLE), colloquially called Jafaican, is a dialect (and/or sociolect) of English that emerged in the late-twentieth century, and is used mainly by young, inner-city, working-class people in inner London. It is said to contain many elements from the languages of the Caribbean (Jamaica and Trinidad and Tobago), South Asia (Indian subcontinent), and West Africa, as well as remnants of traditional Cockney.
- Norfolk English
- Suffolk English

== Heraldry, aristocracy and social class ==
Historically and still today, the traditional upper class is identified as the aristocracy, and social climbers tend to aspire for their descendants to be eventually absorbed by it. The aristocracy can be broadly divided into two categories: the peerage and the gentry. The peerage consists of Peers of the Realm (i.e., holders of the substantive aristocratic titles Baron, Lord of Parliament, Viscount, Earl, Marquess or Duke) and, arguably, their wives and immediate families. English Peers of the Realm and Scottish representative peer were previously entitled to sit in the House of Lords by right, now a smaller number are elected to sit in the Lords by fellow peers. Baronets, Knights, Lairds, Esquires and Gentlemen form the gentry. Members of the gentry enjoy preferential social status but no significant legal privileges. Legally considered "commoners," they could stand for election to the House of Commons. Substantive titles are distinct from courtesy styles of address, more so in the United Kingdom than in some continental systems. In the United Kingdom only the peer is said to be titled, while his wife and children may enjoy courtesy titles or styles. For example, a peer's eldest son may use one of the peer's subsidiary titles (if any) by courtesy but is not considered the substantive holder of that title. Younger children my also enjoy courtesy styles such as "Lord," "Lady," or "The Honourable." Outside of the peer's immediate family, male-line descendants of a previous holder of the peerage (e.g., a male-line cousin) are generally considered to belong to the upper class.

Canting arms of Queen Elizabeth The Queen Mother

A noted example would be Winston Churchill, whose father Lord Randolph Churchill was a younger son of John Spencer-Churchill, 7th Duke of Marlborough. Lord Randolph carried a courtesy title but was legally a commoner and therefore sat in the House of Commons. Being further removed from the dukedom, Winston Churchill was not entitled to any title or style by birthright but, as the grandson (and subsequently nephew and cousin, as the title descended) of a duke, was still considered a member of the upper class. An English citizen with arms registered in the College of Arms, or a Scottish citizen in the Lyon Court, can be referred to as armigerous and is considered (at least) a member of the untitled nobility, a Gentleman. Any British citizen can apply for arms from their respective authority but only those of sufficient social standing, those who are already Gentlemen through means other than armigerousness, would be granted arms. Typically, wealth alone is not seen as a reason to grant arms. Arms in and of themselves are imperfectly aligned with social status, in that many of high status will have no right to arms whilst, on the other hand, those entitled to arms by descent can include branches of families from anywhere on the social scale.

Nevertheless, a right to bear arms under the Law of Arms is, by definition, linked either to the personal acquisition of social status, inspiring application for a personal grant of arms, or to descent from a person who did so in the past. Rightly or wrongly, therefore, the use of a coat of arms is linked to social prestige. Technically, a grant of arms is a confirmation of gentility or nobility, which must be acquired either through a military commission or one of the offices that traditionally come with personal gentility, or through extraordinary achievements or proving a lifestyle befitting to the traditional gentry. Nevertheless, as many people who would not be considered traditional landed gentry (yet) are granted arms, it can be said that a grant of arms is comparable to an act of ennoblement as it is practised in Liechtenstein, Belgium or Spain, despite coming not from the Monarch directly but from one of the two supreme heraldic officers – Garter King of Arms, or Lord Lyon King of Arms.

Britain is unique in the fact that it is possible to acquire social nobility - a kind of noblesse d'apparence - solely by demonstrating social standing and an appropriate lifestyle, and thus, the rank of gentleman can be accorded to a non-armiger not holding a traditionally ennobling office, something that generally has been made impossible on the Continent at the end of the Middle Ages. Until arms are granted, gentility can be challenged and derogated if social status is lost.

In the early twentieth century, it was argued by heraldic writers such as Arthur Charles Fox-Davies that only those with a right to a coat of arms could correctly be described (if men) as gentlemen and of noble status; however, even at the time this argument was controversial, and it was rejected by other writers such as Oswald Barron and Horace Round. Rather, it can be said that not all gentlemen are armigers, but all armigers are (at least) gentlemen.

Thus, apart from receiving a peerage, baronetcy or a knighthood, it is possible to grow into the traditional British nobility by maintaining status for several generations ("It takes three generations to make a gentleman") or extraordinary achievement, usually in combination with acquiring a traditional country house with land. The process is completed by the acquisition of arms.

In the Order of Malta, where proof of technical nobility is a requirement of certain grades of membership, British members must still base their proof upon an ancestral right to a coat of arms. CILANE, the European federation of nobility associations, also considers all British armigers as noble and the granting of arms in Britain as an act of ennoblement or confirmation of nobility.

The relationship between armigerousness and nobility is evidenced in frequent intermarriage between the peerage and the untitled gentry, and by the fact that the younger son of a younger son of a younger son of a Duke and an armiger with a new grant of arms share the same rank - that of gentleman.

Because of the unique British system of aristocracy, it can be said that Britain lacks an established explicitly non-noble upper class (haute bourgeoisie or patriciate), as families that would fall into this category on the Continent are absorbed into the aristocracy in Britain.

Until the 20th century, feudal titles – Lordships of the Manor in England and Feudal Baronies in Scotland - were largely owned by the traditional nobility, and many are still in the hands of the landed gentry, of Peers and even of the Royal Family. They are incorporeal hereditaments just like hereditary peerages, baronetcies and coats of arms but can, unlike them, be freely bequeathed to an appointed heir or even sold. In the late 20th century, it became fashionable for foreign businessmen without a social or historical connection to the British upper class, often without any connection to Britain at all, to purchase them solely with the intent to use the title. This development was accelerated by the Abolition of Feudal Tenure Act in Scotland, which came into force in 2004 and detached Scottish feudal baronies from the manorial houses, the rights and the lands they were attached to (an analogous separation had already occurred in England centuries before). Thus, in the opinion of some commentators feudal titles can not be regarded a mark of nobility by themselves any more, unless they are held under the same conditions as they were in feudal society. However, other commentators point out that feudal titles were often bought, sold or exchanged throughout their history by those seeking to elevate their status, and recent developments simply allow the tradition to continue.

== Criticisms ==
In 1941, George Orwell wrote that Britain was "the most class-ridden society under the sun."

In an interview in 1975 Helmut Schmidt, the then Chancellor of West Germany, stated that:

If one asks oneself what are the true reasons for the differentiated development of societies and economies between the British and most ones on the Continent, I think it has something to do with the fact that British society, much more than the Scandinavian, German, Austrian, and Dutch societies, is characterised by a class-struggle type of society. This is true for both sides of the upper class as well as for the working classes. I think that the way in which organised labour on the one hand and industrial management on the other had dealt with their problems is outmoded.

Later in the same interview, Schmidt said that

You have to treat workers as equal members of society. You have to give them the self-esteem which they can only have if they acquire responsibility. Then you will be able to ask the trade unions to behave and to abstain from those idiotic policies. Then they will accept some guidance from outsiders—from the government or the party or whatever it is. But as long as you maintain the damned class-ridden society of yours you will never get out of your mess.

== See also ==
- British nobility
- Landed Gentry
- British royal family
- The Forsyte Saga
- Hereditary peer
- Income in the United Kingdom
- Mosaic (geodemography) – system designed to classify Britain by postcode, into 11 main groups and 61 types.
- Peerage
- Poverty in the United Kingdom
- Toffs and Toughs

=== UK social stereotypes ===
- Chav, charver (South/North-East England and Yorkshire), scally (North West England), Ned (Scotland) or Spide (Northern Ireland)
- Essex man
- Hooray Henry
- Plebs
- Rah
- Sloane Ranger
- Toff
- White van man

== General and cited references ==
- Jilly Cooper. Class: A View from Middle England, Eyre Methuen, 1979, ISBN 0-552-11525-8
- Kate Fox. Watching the English, Nicholas Brealey Pub., 2004, ISBN 1-85788-508-2
