= Cuckoo (TV series) =

British-Irish sitcom

- Created by: Robin French; Kieron Quirke
- Written by: Robin French; Kieron Quirke
- Directed by: Ben Taylor (Series 1–2); Paul Murphy (Series 3–4); Ben Gregor (Series 5)
- Starring: Andy Samberg; Greg Davies; Helen Baxendale; Tamla Kari; Tyger Drew-Honey; Taylor Lautner; Andie MacDowell; Esther Smith; Matt Lacey; Kenneth Collard
- Composer: Oli Julian
- Country of origin: United Kingdom
- No. of series: 5
- No. of episodes: 33

Production
- Producer: Dan Hine
- Running time: 30 minutes
- Production company: Roughcut Television

Original release
- Network: BBC Three
- Release: 25 September 2012 – 4 January 2019

Cuckoo is a British sitcom that began airing on BBC Three on 25 September 2012, repeating on BBC One, and in 2016 began airing worldwide on Netflix.

Written by Robin French and Kieron Quirke, Cuckoo stars Andy Samberg, Greg Davies, Helen Baxendale, Taylor Lautner, Andie MacDowell, Tamla Kari, Esther Smith, Tyger Drew-Honey, Matt Lacey and Kenneth Collard. The series launch became BBC Three's most-watched comedy launch, beating the record set by Bad Education, which debuted the previous month. Greg Davies was nominated for a BAFTA for Best Male Performance in a Comedy Programme. At the British Comedy Awards, Cuckoo was nominated for Best New Comedy Programme and Greg Davies was nominated for Best TV Comedy Actor.

== Production ==
Following the success of series one, the BBC ordered a second series, but it looked uncertain due to Samberg's busy schedule. In February 2014, it was announced that Samberg would not return for the second series, with Taylor Lautner replacing him as Cuckoo's long-lost lovechild Dale. The second series began on 7 August 2014. On 4 April 2016, Cuckoo was commissioned for two more series. Series 4 wrapped up production on 18 March 2018, confirmed by Lautner via social media. It was released on 2 August 2018.

A pilot for America's NBC television network was under consideration in May 2015.

The show is filmed in the town of Amersham (including the historic 'old town' area), and the adjoining village of Chesham Bois in Buckinghamshire. Some of the outside scenes are also filmed in and around Chesham, Chartridge, Farnham, and Thame, Oxfordshire.

== Plot ==
=== Series 1 ===
Cuckoo is set in Lichfield, Staffordshire, (external scenes are mostly filmed in Farnham, Surrey, Slough, Berkshire, and Amersham, Buckinghamshire, all approximately 100 miles south of Lichfield), home to the Thompson family. When Ken (Davies) and Lorna (Baxendale) collect their daughter Rachel (Kari) from the airport, they learn that she has returned from her gap year before medical school having married Dale "Cuckoo" Ashbrick (Samberg), an eccentric American hippie with an exuberantly loving attitude who does not have a job and loves to take drugs.

=== Series 2 ===
Two years have passed and Cuckoo has gone missing in a climbing accident in the Himalayas, Dylan (Drew-Honey) is planning to attend university, and Rachel (now played by Esther Smith) is moving in with new boyfriend Ben (Lacey). Dale (Lautner), a bearded young American arrives, claiming to be Cuckoo's son and searching for his father whom he has never met. Taking pity, Ken and Lorna ask him to stay.

=== Series 3 ===
Six months after Dale's dramatic departure at the end of the Christmas special of Series 2, Rachel is still heartbroken and missing Dale, but she has managed to salvage a certain friendship with her jilted former fiancé Ben (Lacey). Just as life looks like it is about to return to normal in the Thompson household, a transformed Dale returns to shake things up all over again after having spent some time working for a Chinese 'businessman' in Shanghai. Meanwhile, Ken and Lorna are preparing for the birth of their unplanned new baby, and their son Dylan (Drew-Honey) is getting ready to leave for university. In the first episode, Lorna gives birth to their baby son Sidney.

=== Series 4 ===
Dale and Steve work towards opening a bar called 'All Steve's Pals'. Rachel gets offered a job in Sierra Leone.

Series 4 was released, in full, online on BBC Three on 2 August 2018 with the opening episode titled "Lawyer of the Year".

=== Series 5 ===
Series 5 introduces a new character, Ivy (Andie MacDowell), who comes to the UK from America with a slightly sinister plan. Dale (Taylor Lautner) does not appear in Series 5. His absence is not explained, with Rachel just telling Sid that "Dale is gone". After meeting a strange lady in a pub, Ken decides to run for Lichfield MP.

Series 5 was released in full, online on BBC Three on 4 January 2019 with the opening episode titled "Ivy Arrives".

== Cast and characters ==
Key
= Main cast (actor receives "Starring" credit that series)
= Recurring cast (actor appears in two or more episodes that series)
= Guest (actor who has appeared in another series of Cuckoo but only made 1 appearance in this series)

| Character | Actor | Series | | | | |
| Character | Actor | Series 1 | Series 2 | Series 3 | Series 4 | Series 5 |
|---|---|---|---|---|---|---|
| Dale Ashbrick Sr. / Cuckoo | Andy Samberg | Main | Guest | —N/a | —N/a | —N/a |
| Kenneth "Ken" Thompson | Greg Davies | Main | Main | Main | Main | Main |
| Lorna Thompson | Helen Baxendale | Main | Main | Main | Main | Main |
| Dylan Thompson | Tyger Drew-Honey | Main | Main | Main | Main | Main |
| Rachel Thompson | Tamla Kari | Main | —N/a | —N/a | —N/a | —N/a |
| Rachel Thompson | Esther Smith | —N/a | Main | Main | Main | Main |
| Steve Chance | Kenneth Collard | Recurring | Recurring | Recurring | Main | Main |
| Connie Chance | Selina Griffiths | Recurring | Recurring | —N/a | Guest | —N/a |
| Zoe Chance | Holly Earl | Recurring | Recurring | Recurring | —N/a | —N/a |
| Tony Edwards | Philip Jackson | Recurring | —N/a | —N/a | —N/a | —N/a |
| Nina Morgan | Juliet Cowan | Guest | Recurring | Guest | Recurring | Recurring |
| Dale Ashbrick Jr. | Taylor Lautner | —N/a | Main | Main | Main | —N/a |
| Ben | Matt Lacey | —N/a | Main | Main | —N/a | Main |
| Jane Defreitas | Jacqueline Boatswain | —N/a | Guest | Guest | Recurring | —N/a |
| Pepe | Sevan Stephan | —N/a | Recurring | —N/a | —N/a | —N/a |
| Charles | David Calder | —N/a | Recurring | —N/a | —N/a | —N/a |
| Sidney "Sid" Thompson | Unknown | —N/a | —N/a | Recurring | —N/a | —N/a |
| Sidney "Sid" Thompson | Emilie & Maisie Davison | —N/a | —N/a | Recurring | Recurring | —N/a |
| Sidney "Sid" Thompson | Scott & Zach Durnford | —N/a | —N/a | —N/a | Recurring | —N/a |
| Sidney "Sid" Thompson | Adriano Broccu | —N/a | —N/a | —N/a | —N/a | Recurring |
| Jess | Emma Pierson | —N/a | —N/a | Recurring | —N/a | —N/a |
| Ling | Alice Hewkin | —N/a | —N/a | Recurring | —N/a | —N/a |
| Mr. Xi | Logan Wong | —N/a | —N/a | Recurring | —N/a | —N/a |
| Adrian Minds | Peter Landi | —N/a | —N/a | Guest | Recurring | —N/a |
| Noel Monkwell | Colin Hoult | —N/a | —N/a | —N/a | Recurring | —N/a |
| Ivy Mittelfart | Andie MacDowell | —N/a | —N/a | —N/a | —N/a | Main |
| Tash | Lily Frazer | —N/a | —N/a | —N/a | —N/a | Main |

Notes:

- Only named characters appear in the table above.
- Only characters that have appeared in more than two episodes in a single series appear in the table above.

== Episodes ==
| Series | Episodes | Originally released | |
| Series | Episodes | First released | Last released |
|---|---|---|---|
| 1 | 6 | 25 September 2012 | 30 October 2012 |
| 2 | 7 | 7 August 2014 | 24 December 2014 |
| 3 | 7 | 16 February 2016 | 28 March 2016 |
| 4 | 6 | 2 August 2018 | |
| 5 | 7 | 4 January 2019 | |

=== Series 1 (2012) ===
| No. overall | No. in series | Title | Directed by | Written by | Original release date | Prod. code | UK viewers (millions) |
|---|---|---|---|---|---|---|---|
| 1 | 1 | "The Homecoming" | Ben Taylor | Robin French & Kieron Quirke | 25 September 2012 | TBA | 1.28 |
Middle-class, fortysomething atheist married couple – history-loving solicitor Ken and estate agent Lorna – greet their daughter Rachel at the airport. She has returned from her gap year in Thailand. They are puzzled at her being accompanied by lazy, eccentric American Dale – who calls himself Cuckoo – and that the pair married on a Thai beach. At their bungalow in Lichfield, Rachel is disappointed by her younger brother Dylan's indifference to her marriage. Ken takes a strong disliking to Cuckoo, and gives him £10,000 to leave permanently. Cuckoo spends the money on a small van which he intends to use to sell jacket potatoes from, and returns to the house. Ken is horrified, but pretends to Lorna and Rachel that he gave Cuckoo the money to start a business.
| 2 | 2 | "Family Meeting" | Ben Taylor | Robin French & Kieron Quirke | 2 October 2012 | TBA | 0.85 |
Ken is annoyed at Cuckoo being naked in the house, so he tells Cuckoo to wear clothes, with the exception of when he is in the bathroom or in his and Rachel's bedroom. At Rachel's coming home party, Ken's best friend Steve is horrified to see photos of his 16-year-old daughter, Zoe, on Ken's digital camera. Ken explains that Dylan – who is attracted to her – took them.
| 3 | 3 | "Ken on E" | Ben Taylor | Robin French & Kieron Quirke | 9 October 2012 | TBA | 0.72 |
Ken is preparing for an interview with Nina to become a Liberal Democrat councillor. His chances are jeopardised by Dylan and Nina's 16-year-old son Neil fighting at school and Ken vomiting over her. Lorna's best friend Connie – who is married to Steve – and her son Zeb want Rachel to be with him, despite Rachel being married and not attracted to him. Ken mistakes Dylan's MDMA pills for painkillers. This makes Ken act out of character, becoming extroverted, taking a great liking to Cuckoo and attending a teenage party.
| 4 | 4 | "Grandfather's Cat" | Ben Taylor | Robin French & Kieron Quirke | 16 October 2012 | TBA | 0.88 |
The family visit Lorna's father, Tony, on his birthday in Sheffield. His neighbour's cat, Floxie, who visits him frequently, is there. Cuckoo declares that Floxie is the reincarnation of Lorna's mother Debra, who died recently. Tony agrees, and calls the cat Debra, deciding not to spend the day with Ken at the football. Ken accidentally shoots Floxie dead with Tony's Korean War rifle and puts the body in Tony's holdall. Ken tells Dylan what he did. The family go to a local pub, where Dylan distracts them whilst Ken dumps the holdall with Floxie in it in an overfilled bin. The holdall later falls out. Floxie's owner Anne thinks Floxie has died, until she visits, showing on her tablet computer that Floxie's microchip indicates that Floxie is nearby. Tony's friend Len brings the holdall to Tony. Ken and Cuckoo grab it and tear it apart whilst each are struggling to take it. Floxie's body falls to the ground. Ken admits what he did and the family go home.
| 5 | 5 | "Connie Sings" | Ben Taylor | Robin French & Kieron Quirke | 23 October 2012 | TBA | 0.87 |
Cuckoo encourages Connie to pursue her previously abandoned dream of becoming a professional singer. Her attempts to sing in the Thompson house are dreadful, greatly annoying Ken. Steve is annoyed that Connie is devoting a lot of her time to singing, as he was pleased when she stopped singing in their house years ago. Ken and Lorna are astounded when they find out that every time Steve and Connie have sex together, Steve pretends to be Ken.
| 6 | 6 | "The Wedding" | Ben Taylor | Robin French & Kieron Quirke | 30 October 2012 | TBA | 0.80 |
Rachel and Cuckoo discover that they are not actually married, due to their wedding not being a legal ceremony. Cuckoo is told that he is working illegally and is threatened with deportation. The couple decide to marry as soon as they can. Cuckoo asks Ken to be his best man, which he refuses. Dylan thinks that Cuckoo will ask him, but Cuckoo recruits Steve to the role. Steve resents Cuckoo for contributing to breaking up his marriage to Connie, but is intending to use his position to get rid of Cuckoo. Steve drives Cuckoo, Ken and Dylan to Liverpool in Cuckoo's potato van. In Liverpool, they go to strip clubs. Steve hires an attractive young woman to seduce Cuckoo, so that he can take photographs and show Rachel that he cheated on her. However, she instead takes Dylan's virginity. Steve arranges for Cuckoo to be locked into a shipping container and sent to Asia. Ken objects; he and Steve physically fight. Cuckoo escapes from the container, and he drives Ken home, leaving Steve behind and forgetting about Dylan. Ken tells Cuckoo about Steve's plan to get rid of Cuckoo. Dylan arrives home seconds after Ken and Cuckoo do. The wedding goes ahead, and Ken accepts Cuckoo as his son-in-law.

=== Series 2 (2014) ===
| No. overall | No. in series | Title | Directed by | Written by | Original release date | Prod. code | UK viewers (millions) |
|---|---|---|---|---|---|---|---|
| 7 | 1 | "A New Beginning" | Ben Taylor | Robin French & Kieron Quirke | 7 August 2014 | TBA | 0.75 |
Cuckoo is killed falling whilst 'rescuing' mountain goats in the Lower Himalayan Range in Nepal, oblivious to the fact that they were not in any difficulty. Dylan is at sixth form college and is delighted to be accepted to take media studies at the University of Roehampton. Lorna and Rachel witness a car hitting a 21-year-old man, Dale, who has an American accent, is naive and has no road sense. Rachel is attracted to him and he tells the women that he is from Uttarakhand, India. Arriving home, Lorna and Rachel's car hits the same man. They bring him into the house and Lorna invites him to stay, which Ken is displeased by. Dale says that he is looking for his father, Cuckoo; they tell Dale what happened to Cuckoo. Dale calls Rachel mom, which she dislikes as she is only a year older than him. He tells them that he is from an ashram and that his mother is serving a life sentence for drug smuggling. Ken and Lorna realise that the ashram is a cult. Dale believes that aliens will collect him and other members of the ashram, and that everyone else will be killed. He finds out the next day that the leader, Vashradi, was arrested and the group disbanded. Dale accepts that it was a cult who lied to him and he agrees to live with the Thompsons. Ken's colleague Ben has been Rachel's boyfriend for almost a year; Ben wants to buy a house with Rachel. Ken is persuaded by Lorna to undergo a vasectomy. Steve decides to perform the procedure, and whilst talking about it, Steve tells Ken that he has moved back in with Connie and her lover, Pepe. Ken decides against the vasectomy, but tells Lorna and Dylan that he had the operation.
| 8 | 2 | "Potato Party" | Ben Taylor | Robin French & Kieron Quirke | 14 August 2014 | TBA | N/A |
Dale does not know what to do with his new life in Lichfield. Ken is trying to prevent him from joining another cult, concerned at him finding Hare Krishnas and Jehovah's Witnesses appealing. Ben wants Rachel and himself to get a 25-year mortgage. She is unsure and finds him boring, especially in comparison to Cuckoo. Ken is attending a university reunion. At Zoe's suggestion, Dylan is determined to throw a party in the house whilst Ken is away, after Zoe tells Dylan that she will have sex with him at it. Lorna agrees to let Dylan have a party. She tells Rachel and Ben to supervise and Dale to provide jacket potatoes from the van whilst she goes Stratford with Connie. During the journey, Connie tells Lorna of her disappointment at Steve's refusal to join in when she has sex with Pepe. Lorna tells Connie about Dylan and Connie's daughter Zoe planning to have sex together at the party, thinking that Connie will be pleased like she is. Connie is horrified and drives Lorna back to the house to try to stop them, wrongly insisting to Lorna that Zoe is a virgin. Some of the girls at the party are attracted to Dale and invite him into the house, where he dances with Rachel whilst Ben is asleep. Connie interrupts Dylan and Zoe whilst they are in the bath together and were intending to have sex. The party goers vomit due to food poisoning from the sauce which Dale put on the jacket potatoes – it was two years old and had been made by Cuckoo.
| 9 | 3 | "Tribunal" | Ben Taylor | Ben Edwards, Robin French & Kieron Quirke | 21 August 2014 | TBA | 0.71 |
Ben tells Rachel that Dale is attracted to her and that she should set Dale up with her attractive friend Natalie. They are quickly attracted to each other and kiss. Dale later tells Rachel that Natalie offered him sex and that he declined due to his belief that Natalie is not 'the One'. Steve finds out that Ken is pretending to Lorna that he performed a vasectomy on him. Steve is brought to a tribunal for medical malpractice, for leaving a pair of cuff links in a patient during an operation. Steve blackmails Ken into representing him, saying that he will tell Lorna that the vasectomy did not take place if he does not. Ken and Ben see from Steve's file that he has had two warnings – one for parking in a disabled space and the other for kissing a patient who was in a coma. Ken plans to claim that Steve's wrongdoing is the result of him being overworked. Lorna tells Ken that she has been smoking hashish regularly since Cuckoo went missing. They smoke it together, and when they are in the car, they are stopped by police when she has a small block of it in her pocket. She hands it to him and he eats it, to prevent the policeman finding it. During the hearing, the effects of the hash make Ken unable to properly represent Steve; Ken walks into a glass door, injuring himself. Their colleague Charles takes over. Steve is suspended for a month on full pay. Ben tells Ken that Steve told him about him lying about having had a vasectomy. Ken phones to request an appointment to have the operation.
| 10 | 4 | "Funeral" | Ben Taylor | Jon Foster & James Lamont | 28 August 2014 | TBA | N/A |
Ken and Dale go to a bookshop where Ken buys a first edition of an Edmund Burke book for £1000. Terminally ill Shamus Rafferty, who was Ken's History lecturer at university, tells Ken that he wanted to buy it, so Ken reluctantly lends it to him. Shamus dies and Ken goes to the funeral with Lorna, Dylan and Dale, pretending to have been close to him in order to retrieve the book. At the funeral, Ken takes the book, but is caught by his niece. Dale is mistaken for Shamus' lover, until his real lover says who he is. Dylan persuades Shamus' great-niece to kiss him, and later to give him a handjob – which the guests see.
| 11 | 5 | "Ken at Work" | Ben Taylor | Jon Foster, James Lamont, Robin French & Kieron Quirke | 4 September 2014 | TBA | N/A |
Ken and his colleague Jane are competing for the position of senior partner, which is being vacated by Charles due to his retirement. In response to Rachel saying that Ben is dull, the couple have sex in the stationery cupboard – unaware that there are CCTV cameras in the room. They narrowly avoid being seen by Jane when she steals a large quantity of supplies from the room. Ken is unaware of Rachel and Ben having had sex in the room and sends the CCTV footage in an email to Charles in order to prove that Jane stole and therefore to make Charles choose Ken as his successor. Ken finds out about the sex session, so he goes to the office with Ben and Dale to take Charles' laptop to prevent him from seeing the footage. Ken walks in on Charles in his office and assumes him to be masturbating to the footage. Ken asks him to delete the email, which he does. When Ken makes a speech after Charles announces him as his successor, the staff laugh. Ken thinks that Charles showed them the footage. Jane tells them that they do not know about CCTV footage, and that they are laughing about the sexual tweets he and Lorna sent each other, wrongly believing them to be privately sent. Charles informs everyone that he was not masturbating. He was mopping up his urine with toilet roll as he has Parkinson's disease, which causes him incontinence, and is one of the reasons for his retirement. Rachel introduces Dale to the Internet and they enjoy sending each other instant messages via computer. Dylan wins first prize in a poetry competition. However, Connie, who is in the audience to see Zoe read her poem, points out that his 'poem' is the Friends theme tune I'll Be There for You by The Rembrandts. Dylan therefore loses his prize.
| 12 | 6 | "Neighbourhood Watch" | Ben Taylor | Ben Edwards | 11 September 2014 | TBA | N/A |
Lorna hears what she assumes to be burglars and tells Ken to confront them. Dale goes outside. The van is in the drive, slightly damaged. Dylan, who stayed overnight in the shed after crashing the van in the drive, sneaks into his bedroom via the window. At Lorna's suggestion, she, Ken, Dylan and Dale attend a neighbourhood watch meeting headed by Steve. Steve demonstrates martial arts techniques, but is easily defeated by Dale, who fights at a very advanced level. Nina's BMW car is stolen from the street outside the house. Ben takes Rachel to a show home which is very similar to the new house which he wants them to buy together on a mortgage. He likes it a lot, but she thinks it is bland and she walks off. The group search for the BMW, and when Ken sees it, they follow it at high speed to outside Nina's house. Dale finds Rachel and saves her from being hit by the BMW. As the driver exits the vehicle, Ken and Steve tackle him. He is Zeb, who had told Nina in a text message that he was borrowing it. Lorna and Connie arrive; Zeb informs them all that Dylan crashed the van. Terry confronts Ken, whose punch aimed at him instead knocks Nina to the ground. Police arrive, handcuff him, but then release him because Nina is not pressing charges. At home, Rachel kisses Dale as he is in bed and climbs on top of him.
| 13 | 7 | "Christmas Special" | Ben Taylor | Robin French & Kieron Quirke | 24 December 2014 | TBA | N/A |
Lorna and Connie are Christmas shopping when Lorna faints. A midwife who is nearby asks Lorna if she is pregnant. Nina visits Ken at work and tells him that she is organising a Christmas play, and wants him to play Father Christmas. Rachel is puzzled and shocked when she finds a giant topiary of a bird, made by Dale, in the house. She tells Ben that it a present to him from her. Lorna takes pregnancy tests, which are all positive. Rachel tells him that they cannot have a relationship and that they need to keep secret the fact that they had sex. Dylan tells his parents that he is performing in the show because Zoe told him that she will only want him if does so. Dale tells Dylan that he had intercourse for the first time and that he thinks he is in love with her, but does not state who his lover is. Ken is annoyed at Lorna inviting Connie and Steve to the Thompsons' Birmingham balti restaurant dinner on 23 December. Ben finds the used pregnancy tests and assumes that Rachel is pregnant and he tells Ken that he intends to propose to her during that dinner; Dale overhears Ben. Lorna visits a GP, Dr King, who informs her that she is two months pregnant. She tells Dr King that cannot be true, because her husband had a vasectomy four months ago. The dinner is also attended by Zoe and Pepe. In the restaurant's kitchen, Dale tells Rachel to choose between him and Ben; she tells him that she chooses Ben. Steve tells Connie that he demands to move back into the master bedroom with Connie and that Pepe can live in the spare room. Steve orders the hottest phall; he is wheeled away on a stretcher with a severe burning sensation. Ben persuades Ken to play Santa in the play. After leaving the restaurant, Pepe tells Dale that he is moving to Solihull. Connie, Steve (who is performing) and Lorna arrive for the play. Ben is performing in the play as an elf. As the play is about to start, Ken receives a note from Dale telling him that he is leaving. Ken goes to Lichfield City railway station in his Santa suit; Dale tells him that he had sex with Rachel. Ken decides to stop Ben proposing, because she does not love Ben. Ben proposes during the performance; she accepts, but then withdraws it when Ken arrives and advises her against it. Rachel is puzzled by Ken saying that she is pregnant, and Lorna tells him that it is her who is pregnant. Ken tells Lorna that he had the vasectomy two months later than he claimed. Dylan sings "Hark! The Herald Angels Sing". At home, the family have Christmas dinner. Rachel is upset at seeing Dale drive off in the van.

=== Series 3 (2016) ===
| No. overall | No. in series | Title | Directed by | Written by | Original release date | Prod. code | UK viewers (millions) |
|---|---|---|---|---|---|---|---|
| 14 | 1 | "Birth" | Paul Murphy | Robin French & Kieron Quirke | 16 February 2016 | TBA | N/A |
Dale returns from Shanghai, where he has spent the seven months since he left at Christmas. Ben is horrified at Dale's return. Rachel assumes that he has returned for her, but he tells her that he is in love with Ling. She is the daughter of Mr Xi, his boss in Shanghai; he forced Dale to leave Shanghai because of his disapproval of his and Ling's relationship. Ken and Lorna are pleased to have Dale back; Lorna invites him to stay as long as he wants to and says he can move into Dylan's room, which he does. Lorna and Ben want Ken to take paternity leave, so six months of it is granted to him, without notice, despite him not wanting it. Lorna, Ken, Rachel, Ben and Dale go to the hospital, where Lorna gives birth to their son. Jess, an acquaintance of Ken and Lorna's, gives birth in the same hospital at the same time. Ken becomes lost in the hospital and is mistaken by a midwife for being the father of Jess' baby. Consequently he is not present at his son's birth, but arrives at Lorna's bedside shortly afterwards. Ken and Lorna name their baby Sid.
| 15 | 2 | "The Application" | Paul Murphy | Robin French & Kieron Quirke | 22 February 2016 | TBA | N/A |
Ben tells Rachel that she should become the manager of the office where she, he and Ken work when the position is vacated by Cathy, who is retiring. He tells Rachel that it is a natural progression from her office assistant position there. He says that she wants a more interesting job than managing that boring office. Rachel wants to apply for a job with human rights charity Pegasus Alliance, which is run by Nina. Ken's attempt to convince Nina to accept the application fails because it was submitted online seconds past the deadline. Ken and Rachel are horrified to discover that Dale has kidnapped Nina and is holding her in the garage in order to force her to hire Rachel. Dale says that it was the way that Mr Xi conducted business, and reveals that Mr Xi was the leader of a gang of triads. Ken, Rachel and Ben pretend that Ken has also been kidnapped whilst Dale, Ben and Rachel wear masks and pretend to kidnappers to continue the charade. When Ben tries to phone the police, Rachel and Dale gag him and tie him to a chair in the house. Nina tells Ken that she rejected Rachel's application because she is not good enough rather than because her application was late; Rachel and Dale overhear her. Nina realises that they are in the Thompson's garage, then Lorna walks in. Rachel tells Nina that she kidnapped her to prove herself good enough for the job; Nina accepts Rachel to the position. Ken hires Dale to be Sid's nanny for £50 per week. Rachel realises that Ben is still tied up.
| 16 | 3 | "Mums Group" | Paul Murphy | Robin French & Kieron Quirke | 29 February 2016 | TBA | N/A |
Jess invites Ken and Dale to join a Mums' Group. Ken and Dale join and enjoy it. Lorna sees Jess there and becomes more convinced that Jess she is attracted to Ken. He does not think so, and Jess tells him that she is happily married. Ken tells Lorna that due to a mix up he was with Jess at the hospital when Sid was born, which Lorna is angry with Ken about. Jess invites Ken and Dale to her house. When they arrive, Ken finds out that none of the rest of the group are there and is horrified when Jess gets him alone, tells him that her partner Marc does not exist, takes her clothes off and tries to seduce him. He rejects Jess and goes home, where he realises that he has brought back Jess' baby, Eliza, instead of Sid. Ken and Dale attempt to swap back babies with Jess without Lorna finding out. A mistake in doing so means that although the babies are swapped, Ken has to tell Lorna about the events of that day. Rachel uses a dating app to have a one-night stand at the house with a young man, Freddy.
| 17 | 4 | "Life of Dale" | Paul Murphy | Ben Edwards | 7 March 2016 | TBA | N/A |
It is Ken's birthday: he, Lorna, Rachel, Dale and Steve play Trivial Pursuit. Teamed with Ken, Dale decides to tell the story of his time in Shanghai in order to reveal how he knows the answer to a question which Steve has asked Ken. Dale talks about how he met Mr Xi, members of his gang and Ling. Dale is unaware that he was recruited to deliver drugs, falsely assuming that the white powder was washing powder. Lorna forgets it is Ken's birthday until the day; her present to him is attending a lecture by Simon Schama. Dale's present to Ken is a cake and alcohol.
| 18 | 5 | "University Challenged" | Paul Murphy | Ben Edwards | 14 March 2016 | TBA | N/A |
Dylan has a brief conversation with Zoe over webcam, expecting to enjoy masturbating to her nude. Instead she tells him that she does not want him any more because she has found a better, new lover at university. Dylan decides to leave university after only three weeks there – having not attended any lectures – because he hates it. Ken is horrified, as he does not want Dylan to come home. He and Dale head there to try to pressure him to stay. Ken tries to have the tuition fees of £9,000 refunded, but that request is refused by the university supervisor. Dale enjoys his visit. Ken and Dylan cheer up when they attend a party which an attractive girl student, Charlie, invites them to. The party is ended by the supervisor. Ken leads Dylan, Dale and another student, Nathan, to lift the supervisor's electric car onto an island in a lake. They do so, and kill a duck in the process. The supervisor sees them and expels Dylan. Rachel finds the engagement ring which Ben was going to give her and tells her that he keeps it in the hope that she decides that she wants him again. Rachel drops it and Sid swallows it. The three visit Dr King, who tries to persuade Rachel to marry Ben.
| 19 | 6 | "Sid's Big Day" | Paul Murphy | Jon Foster, James Lamont, Robin French & Kieron Quirke | 21 March 2016 | TBA | N/A |
At the Thompson's, Sid's naming ceremony is taking place. Lorna sends an invitation to Ken's mother, Belinda. Ken is angry with Lorna for doing that as he hates Belinda and has not seen her for five years. Belinda drives from Spain in a 1976 Triumph Stag, a classic car which she inherited from Ken's father, Alan. Lorna hears Belinda on the phone to a 'consultant' who is actually a horoscope reader and mistakenly assumes that Belinda has terminal cancer – so she should go on a drive with his mother. Ken crashes her car, which he believes should be his. Rachel helps organise the ceremony, which Dale leads. Dylan has an argument with Zoe, who is at the ceremony with her new boyfriend, Max. Lorna tells Ken that Belinda is dying, before she reveals that she is not. Belinda also reveals that Alan was not his real father and that she was pregnant when she met him. Ken is shocked by this, and by Dale circumcising Sid. Rachel finds a letter from Ling to Dale – but withholds the letter from him because he is starting to become attracted to Rachel again, which is what Rachel wants.
| 20 | 7 | "The Holiday" | Paul Murphy | Robin French & Kieron Quirke | 28 March 2016 | TBA | N/A |
Ken drives the family to Cumbria, he and Lorna having told Rachel, Dylan and Dale that it is a holiday. Dylan is not happy about going to Cumbria, but soon after arriving, he desperately tries to impress Lauren, whom he meets in a pub. Dylan tells Dale that Rachel is still attracted to Dale. Ken and Lorna reveal that the only reason they came to Cumbria is that Ken's biological father lived there. They are told by the pub's barman that Ken's real father, Big Jack, died last year – and later tells Ken and Lorna about Jack's adventurous life. At home, Steve confronts Ben, who tells Steve that he was asked by Ken to water the plants whilst the family are away. Steve tells Ben that he is there as part of neighbourhood watch. Ben answers the door to Mr Xi and Ling, who are looking for Dale. Mr Xi says that he now agrees to Ling marrying Dale. Dale and Rachel have sex. She unsuccessfully tries to stop him seeing a text from Ben stating that Ling is on her way to Cumbria. Rachel admits that she hid a letter that arrived for him. Dale is angry at her for withholding the letter. Ben drives Steve, Mr Xi and Ling to Cumbria. During the journey, Ling and Ben bond. When Mr Xi and Ling arrive, Dale reveals that he loves Rachel – and Ling accepts. Mr Xi gives Steve a gun. Mr Xi does not accept Dale's refusal to marry Ling, and forces Dale to leave with him and Ling. Once they leave, Ben reveals he loves Ling and that she likes him. Ken drives Lorna, Rachel, Ben and Steve to try to stop them – as Dylan spends time with Lauren. Steve shoots their car, causing it to crash into a tree. Ben admits his feelings for Ling – and Mr Xi reluctantly agrees. The three leave in a helicopter to Shanghai.

=== Series 4 (2018) ===
| No. overall | No. in series | Title | Directed by | Written by | Original release date | Prod. code | UK viewers (millions) |
|---|---|---|---|---|---|---|---|
| 21 | 1 | "Lawyer of the Year" | Paul Murphy | Robin French & Kieron Quirke | 2 August 2018 | TBA | N/A |
Dylan has a low-paid job in phone sales, which Ken is disappointed with. Ken is pleased to be nominated for Lichfield Lawyer of the Year; the ceremony – which also includes other categories – is run by Pegasus Alliance. Ken is disappointed when Jane tells him that she is also nominated. He is horrified at the photo of him which is on display in the office, in which he is clearly drunk and holding a can of lager. He believes that Jane will win. Lorna asks Nina to make sure that Ken wins. Dale is delighted that he and Rachel are in love with each other. He asks Ken for permission to propose to Rachel. Ken has no objection to him proposing, but advises him to find employment first. Dale has few skills which employers seek and when he goes to the jobcentre, he is advised to work on himself. He reads American self-help books. He is one of two living statues at the ceremony. During his break there, he tries to find work from the attendees, but collapses and has to leave. Jane wins the award. Steve plans to open a bar called All Steve's Pals. He unsuccessfully tries to involve Ken and Lorna in it. Dale spends all of his savings buying 49% of Steve's bar, which Rachel is angry about, telling him that he should have spent the money on a deposit for a house.
| 22 | 2 | "The Licence" | Paul Murphy | Paul Doolan | 2 August 2018 | TBA | N/A |
Ken is suspended from work for a month for unprofessional behaviour, damage to the reputation of the firm and using the awards ceremony to insult his colleagues. He tries to prevent Lorna from finding out. Dale starts the business partnership with Steve on the cocktail bar/beach bar. Rachel tries to persuade him to pull out and is disappointed that the premises that Steve and Dale have bought is in bad condition and in a bad part of the city. Their application for an alcohol licence is rejected by Frank, who says that he will accept it if he is bribed to do so. Lorna pressures Ken to go along with her pretending to Frances that Sid is transgender to gain a place for him in her nursery. The couple put him in a dress and hold a birthday party for him at home. When Sid says that he was made to wear the dress, Frances is angry at their deception. Lorna decides to send flowers with a card apologising. Mix-ups result in the flowers being sent to Frank and dog faeces to Frances.
| 23 | 3 | "Ken's New Friend" | Paul Murphy | Robin French & Kieron Quirke | 2 August 2018 | TBA | N/A |
Ken is angry with their next-door neighbours playing loud music at night and phones the police to report it. Ken and Lorna visit them and meet Lloyd, whose 45th birthday party is being held with his young Australian partner Maggie and her friends. The police arrive and arrest Maggie for drug possession. The two men become friends. Lloyd tells Ken that Maggie received a police caution and that he feels sure that it was Steve who called the police. Ken tells Lloyd that he has been suspended from work, which Dale overhears. Lloyd is devastated when Maggie is arrested and deported for being an illegal immigrant. Lloyd tries to kill Steve on Steve's front lawn; Dale stops him. Ken admits that he called the police. Dale tells Lorna that Ken has been suspended; Lorna is angry with Ken and tells him not to come home tonight. Ken accidentally sets fire to Lloyd's Vespa. Steve tells Ken that he still has him.
| 24 | 4 | "Trapped" | Paul Murphy | Robin French, Kieron Quirke, Paul McKenna, Jon Foster & James Lamont | 2 August 2018 | TBA | N/A |
Ken is trapped in Steve's bar when a plasterboard wall is installed without a door in it. Steve pretends to try to have him released whilst keeping him there, tricking him into believing that Lorna has a new lover and that she wants Ken to move in with Steve permanently. Ken breaks through the wall and goes home, followed by Steve. Lorna is delighted that Dylan has a new girlfriend – until she finds out that it is Connie. Lorna is angry when Dylan asks Lorna to break up with her on his behalf. Connie tells Lorna that very soon after her engagement to Pepe, he was conscripted into the Israeli Army. Lorna refuses Dylan's request and he breaks up with Connie himself. She angrily leaves and bumps into Ken, whom she hates and deliberately knees in the groin. She then sees Steve and they passionately reunite. Rachel's period is a fortnight late and she tells Lorna about her suspected pregnancy. Dale overhears and is overjoyed. Rachel takes a pregnancy test, which the couple see is negative. She is delighted at the result; he is disappointed.
| 25 | 5 | "Walkabout" | Paul Murphy | James Lamont & Jon Foster | 2 August 2018 | TBA | N/A |
Rachel asks Dale for space, which Dale misunderstands and takes literally, stranding her alone in the Pennines without supplies. Her mobile phone has no signal and she does not know where she is. She asks a middle-aged woman, Debbie, who walks past to guide her. She tells Rachel that she will walk with her to the A515. Rachel's phone gains a signal, and she takes a call from Nina, who offers her a job in Sierra Leone. It soon switches itself off due to running out of power. Ken is horrified when Dale tells him about leaving Rachel in the Pennines and Ken drives Dale to find her. He finds out her location from Dylan, who tracked her phone when it was briefly connected. Ken and Dylan find Rachel. Ken leaves a message on his workplace's answering machine to explain the situation regarding Rachel. However, due to the poor signal, his message cuts out several times, making it seem like he is being hostile to them.
| 26 | 6 | "Opening Night" | Paul Murphy | Joe Parham & Paul Doolan | 2 August 2018 | TBA | N/A |
It is All Steve's Pals' opening night – and Rachel considers whether to accept Nina's offer of a six month position in Sierra Leone. Ken has been sacked and intends to regain his job by taking his former colleagues to dinner. Soon after they arrive at the restaurant, Steve takes them to the bar's opening night. Ken arrives at the restaurant alone, where he receives a phone call from Lorna telling his that his colleagues are at the bar. Ken arrives at the bar, which is very successful. All colleagues apart from Jane are keen for him to return, but Lorna tells them that Ken does not want to work with them again and is starting his own law firm. Steve sets the bar on fire, which he tells Ken was deliberate in order to make a large claim on the bar's insurance policy. Rachel tells Dale about moving to Sierra Leone, and he decides to move with her.

=== Series 5 (2019) ===
| No. overall | No. in series | Title | Directed by | Written by | Original release date | Prod. code | UK viewers (millions) |
|---|---|---|---|---|---|---|---|
| 27 | 1 | "Ivy Arrives" | Ben Gregor | Robin French & Kieron Quirke | 4 January 2019 | TBA | N/A |
Rachel has moved back home without Dale after completing her placement in Sierra Leone. Ken now runs his own law firm. Ken is surprised to learn that he has an older, paternal, American half-sister Ivy – and that she is going to visit him. At first he has little interest in meeting her. However, when they find out that she is very rich, he and the rest of the family become eager to meet her. He is disappointed that her only interest in him is to pay him in advance for his corpse. All the family dislike Ivy due to her arrogant, patronising way of speaking to them. He accepts the deal, but it falls through when Ivy's husband Ron is arrested for fraud and the couple's assets are seized. She asks Ken to stay at his place, but he refuses – so she stays across the road from them at Steve's.
| 28 | 2 | "Ivy Nanny" | Ben Gregor | Robin French & Kieron Quirke | 4 January 2019 | TBA | N/A |
Ben returns from China, having fallen out with Ling's Triad father, whom he worked for. Ben has a new girlfriend, Tash, whom Rachel meets. Sid has a nanny, Angela. She leaves after Ken walks in on her whilst he is naked and grabs her buttocks, having mistaken her from behind for Lorna. Ken tries to encourage Angela back – which she responds to by making a failed attempt to initiate an affair with him. Despite hating Ivy, he recruits her as Sid's new nanny. Ivy falsely claims to Lorna that Angela left because Sid kicked her. Ken wants Sid to go to a private school, which Lorna and Rachel disapprove of. Lorna changes her mind due to believing that Sid kicked Angela, thinking that it will be a suitable environment for him. Angela's husband, Goran, sends threatening text messages to Ken. Goran comes to the Thompsons' house and physically attacks Ken, during which Ken accidentally knocks him out. Shortly after Lorna comes home, Goran gets up and leaves.
| 29 | 3 | "Weed Farm" | Ben Gregor | Robin French & Kieron Quirke | 4 January 2019 | TBA | N/A |
Ivy sees Dylan selling drugs to a youth. He takes her to an unoccupied country house that his estate agency is selling where he is growing a small amount of cannabis. She greatly expands his operation into a cannabis farm. Ken pretends to be David Steel, a client of Lorna's estate agency in order for the two of them to spend time alone together in empty houses and have sex whilst Ken pretends to be Steel. Rachel sees Steve looking into the Thompsons' house and he tells her that he thinks that Ivy and Dylan are having an incestuous affair. Steve and Rachel follow Ivy and Dylan to the country house, where Ken and Lorna arrive soon after and have sex. Ivy is horrified when Dylan naively invites drug dealers to the country house to try to do a deal with them. Dylan is disgusted when he sees on a CCTV camera his parents having sex in the house. Ben and Tash arrive. Two dealers break in – wearing balaclavas and carrying crowbars. Steve walks in and is followed by Rachel, Ben and Tash. Steve thinks that Ken is also having an affair with Ivy. The dealer demand to take over the drug farm. Lorna's colleague Amanda arrives, showing a Muslim family the house.
| 30 | 4 | "Macbeth" | Ben Gregor | Robin French & Kieron Quirke | 4 January 2019 | TBA | N/A |
Steve joins Ken in the pub, where a strange woman tells Ken that he will be the Liberal Democrat candidate for Lichfield. Steve tells Ken that his name before he changed it by deed poll was Graham, and that he intends to marry Ivy. When the current local MP resigns, Ken wants to be the LD candidate for the by-election it causes. However, Nina chooses Yusra Duncan. Dylan goes for a job interview at Yusra's garden centre. Yusra rejects Dylan for the job, but the two have sex together whilst dressed as teddy bears, at her suggestion. Ivy hires Ben to divorce Ron. She receives a letter from UK immigration telling her that her visa has expired and she has to leave the UK within 90 days. She decides to marry a British citizen to stay in the country. Rachel and Tash become friends and animal rights activists. They chain themselves to the gates of the mansion of Gordon Andrews – an 86-year-old multimillionaire owner of a poultry business who needs a wheelchair and an oxygen tank – whilst he is hosting a fundraiser for the LD. The girls' plan is ineffective because the gates they chained themselves to are at the side, so the main entrance is still used. They cannot unchain themselves, because Tash swallowed the key. Whilst there, they kiss. Ivy tries to seduce Gordon; he proposes to her. Ken and Lorna go the fundraiser, where he plans to use a video of Dylan and Yusra having sex to blackmail Nina and Yusra into letting him be the LD candidate instead, but backs out of his plan. Yusra resigns in reaction to finding out about the sex tape; Ken becomes the LD candidate instead. As the tape is accidentally played to the attendees on a large screen, Gordon appears to suffer a heart attack.
| 31 | 5 | "Divorce Party" | Ben Gregor | Robin French, Kieron Quirke, Jon Foster & James Lamont | 4 January 2019 | TBA | N/A |
Ivy's divorce was finalised yesterday, so Steve throws a divorce party for her at his house. Lorna thinks Ivy is controlling Ken. She hates the bright suit that Ivy encouraged him to buy. At the party, Lorna cuts the suit up with Steve's sword. Ivy uses the sword to chop an effigy of Ron, then she stamps on it. At the Thompsons' house, Rachel and Tash tell Ben that they kissed. He is pleased, and says that lesbianism does not count as infidelity. Later, when the girls are alone, they kiss passionately.
| 32 | 6 | "Two Engagements and a Funeral" | Ben Gregor | Robin French & Kieron Quirke | 4 January 2019 | TBA | N/A |
Ivy has a misunderstanding with her vet which results in him euthanising her dog. Ivy continues her plan to marry a British citizen. She tells Steve that she wants to enter a marriage of convenience with him. Steve is attracted to her and immediately agrees to marry her, thinking he can turn it into a conventional marriage, even though she tells him that he cannot. Steve holds a funeral for the dog and tells Ivy that he has had its head frozen. Ken and Lorna have dinner with Lorna's ex to try to gain funds for Ken's by-election campaign. A mix-up results in Steve having part of the Thompsons' dinner frozen and the Thompsons serving Ivy's dog's head at dinner, horrifying their guest. Tash wants to reveal to everyone that she enjoyed her kiss with Rachel and wants them to become an out lesbian couple. Rachel is unsure of her sexual orientation and does not want to tell anyone about their kiss. Frustrated, Tash decides to accept Ben's proposal and marry him to get back at Rachel.
| 33 | 7 | "Election" | Ben Gregor | Robin French & Kieron Quirke | 4 January 2019 | TBA | N/A |
Ivy is leading Ken's by-election campaign, but his chances at winning are reduced significantly when a tape of him and Ivy swearing whilst talking about a child who annoyed them is released. Ron returns, making her choose either him or her family. She chooses Ken – but Ron abducts her in a small private plane. Steve stows away onboard the plane, then Ivy uses a fire extinguisher to knock out Ron and the pilot, then lands the plane. Ken is falsely credited by the media with helping to prevent Ivy being kidnapped, which significantly improves his public image. The election is about to be announced.

Netflix premiered series 1 and 2 for streaming audiences on 7 March 2016. Series 3 was subsequently added on 16 February 2017. Series 4 was subsequently added on 14 December 2018. Series 5 was subsequently added on 19 April 2019. All five series were removed from Netflix in April 2023.

== DVD release ==
Region 2
| Title | Release date |
|---|---|
| Cuckoo: Complete Series 1 | 1 September 2014 |
| Cuckoo: Complete Series 1 & 2 | 4 January 2016 |
| Cuckoo: Complete Series 2 | 14 March 2016 |
| Cuckoo: Complete Series 3 | 20 June 2016 |
| Cuckoo: Complete Series 4 | 11 March 2019 |
| Cuckoo: Complete Series 1–3 | 17 April 2019 |
| Cuckoo: Complete Series 5 | 8 April 2019 |

== U.S. version ==
In May 2015, NBC announced a US pilot of Cuckoo, starring Michael Chiklis, Cheryl Hines, and Flula Borg, was to be produced. UK writers Robin French and Kieron Quirke, who created the BBC series, wrote the adaptation with The Simpsons veteran Tim Long. The project was not picked up as a series.
