= Gap Yah =

Comedy sketch

A typical scene, depicting Orlando talking on the phone.

Gap Yah is a comedy sketch that gained widespread popularity and press coverage, especially in the United Kingdom, after being published on the video-sharing site YouTube in February 2010. It was created and performed by the University of Oxford graduate Matt Lacey of sketch comedy theatre troupe The Unexpected Items. The video was produced and directed by VM Productions and The Unexpected Items. The video became a viral hit, with 660,000 views in its first month and around 50,000 views a day in late March 2010. As of January 2024, the original video has been viewed more than 6.9 million times.

The video depicts a student named Orlando describing to his friend Tarquin several of his experiences and encounters during a gap year in Tanzania, Peru and Burma, all of which resulted in him vomiting—or "chundering"—everywhere. The video is a spoof of the British upper-middle-class ex-public school students (using distinctively drawn-out vowels)—commonly known as rahs—who boast about their experiences, typically in the third world, prior to attending university.

The sketch has resulted in the term being increasingly used in schools and universities across the United Kingdom. An online following has developed, with tribute Facebook pages as well as several remixed versions of the video having been created by others. Phrases from the video have become cultural memes, with the phrase "...and then I just chundered everywhere" being added to satirise election posters of Conservative Party leader and former UK prime minister David Cameron as well as events such as the eruption of the Icelandic Eyjafjallajökull volcano. Gap Yah is described by its creator as follows:

"It's a satire on the great number of people who seem to be leaving these shores to vomit all over the developing world."

— Matt Lacey, The Guardian

Lacey also states that "depressingly, there are a lot of these people and I even have elements of them myself."

A sequel to the sketch, Gap Yah 2: Afterparty, was released on 26 April 2010; it was also highly successful, reaching more than 1.4 million views by September 2018. It features Orlando, again chatting to his friend Tarquin on his mobile, while he and his friend Pandora place posters around a town to advertise a fund-raising event for "Haiti, in Africa". An official Gap Yah single, "Gap Yah ft. The Banter", was released in June 2010, and Gap Yah 3: Intahnshup was released on 12 December 2013.
