= Matt Lacey =

British actor and comedian

- Born: Matt Lacey; 1987 (age 38–39)
- Spouse: Frankie Ward (m. 2021)

Comedy career
- Years active: 2009–present
- Medium: Television, YouTube

Matt Lacey (born 1987) is a British actor and comedian. He is best known for his recurring role as Ben in the BBC television series Cuckoo and as Orlando in the Gap Yah viral comedy sketch.

== Life and career ==
Lacey was born in the United Kingdom in 1987 to Irish parents and studied at the Whitgift School, South Croydon, as a child. He went on to study modern history at Oriel College, Oxford. At Oxford he was a founder member of the Unexpected Items, a comedy group who would perform in pubs and later at festivals and comedy nights. He was working in his family's construction business as recently as 2010 to support his comedy and acting work.

His break-through was in the role of Orlando in the comedy sketch Gap Yah, produced and directed by Lacey's Unexpected Items team and VM Productions. The video became a viral hit on YouTube, with 660,000 views in its first month and around 50,000 "fresh hits a day" in late March 2010. As of early 2017 the video had over 6 million views, while follow-ups part 2 and 3 have over 1.5 million views combined.

Lacey joined the cast of Cuckoo on BBC Three in 2014 and was a recurring character in seasons 2 and 3 alongside Greg Davies, Helen Baxendale and Twilight star Taylor Lautner.

In 2018 Lacey was touring on stage in a Bill Kenwright production of the Edgar Wallace play The Case of the Frightened Lady, he joined the cast as Detective Sergeant Totty in September 2018.

== Filmography ==
=== Film ===
- Life Goes On as Burgundy

=== Television ===
- EastEnders E20 as Party Guy 3
- EastEnders as Dr. Bruce Field
- Cuckoo as Ben
