= Grace Gates =

Gates to Lord's Cricket Ground, London

Coordinates: 51°31′42″N 0°10′23″W

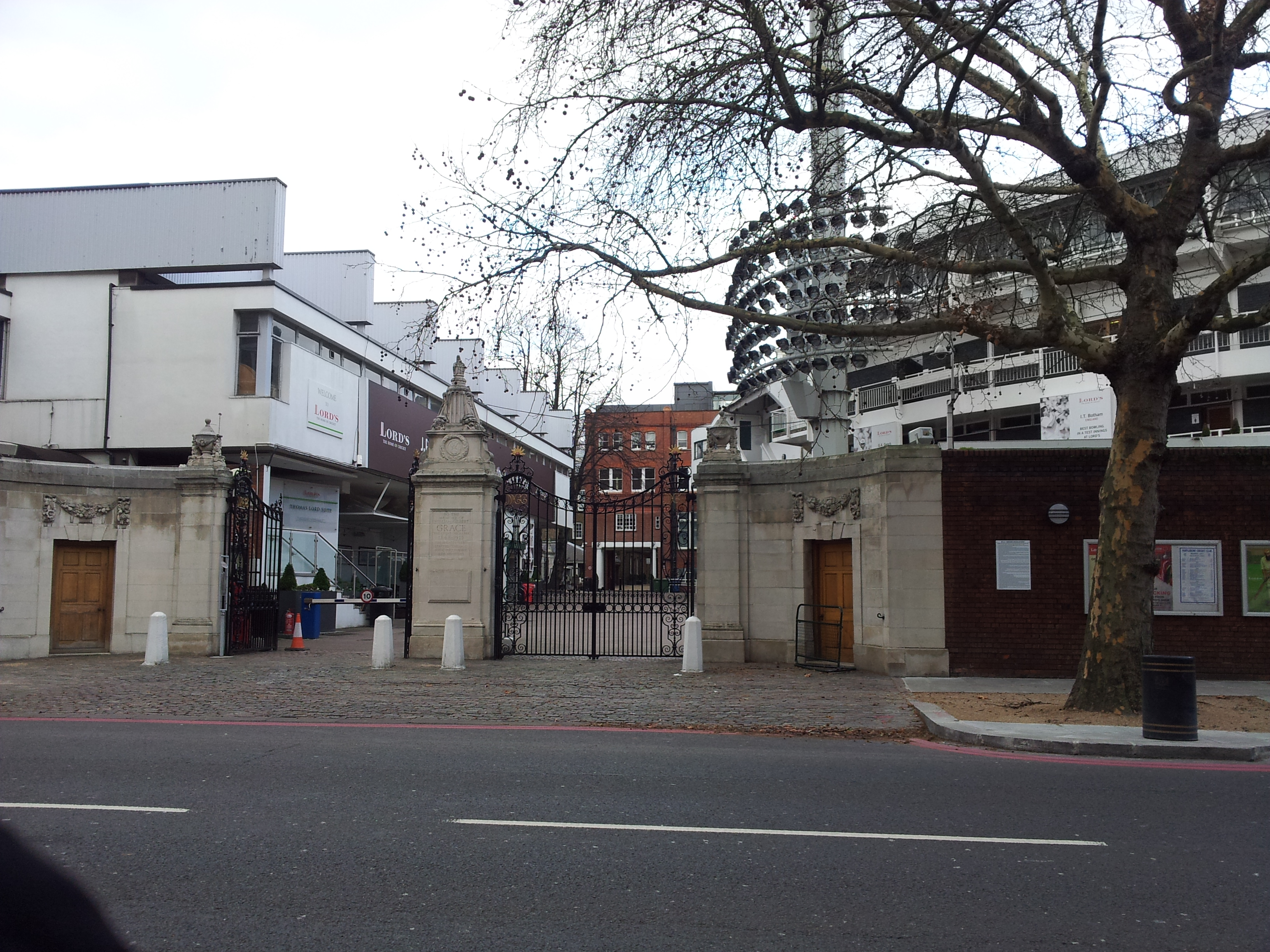
The W. G. Grace Memorial Gates in 2012

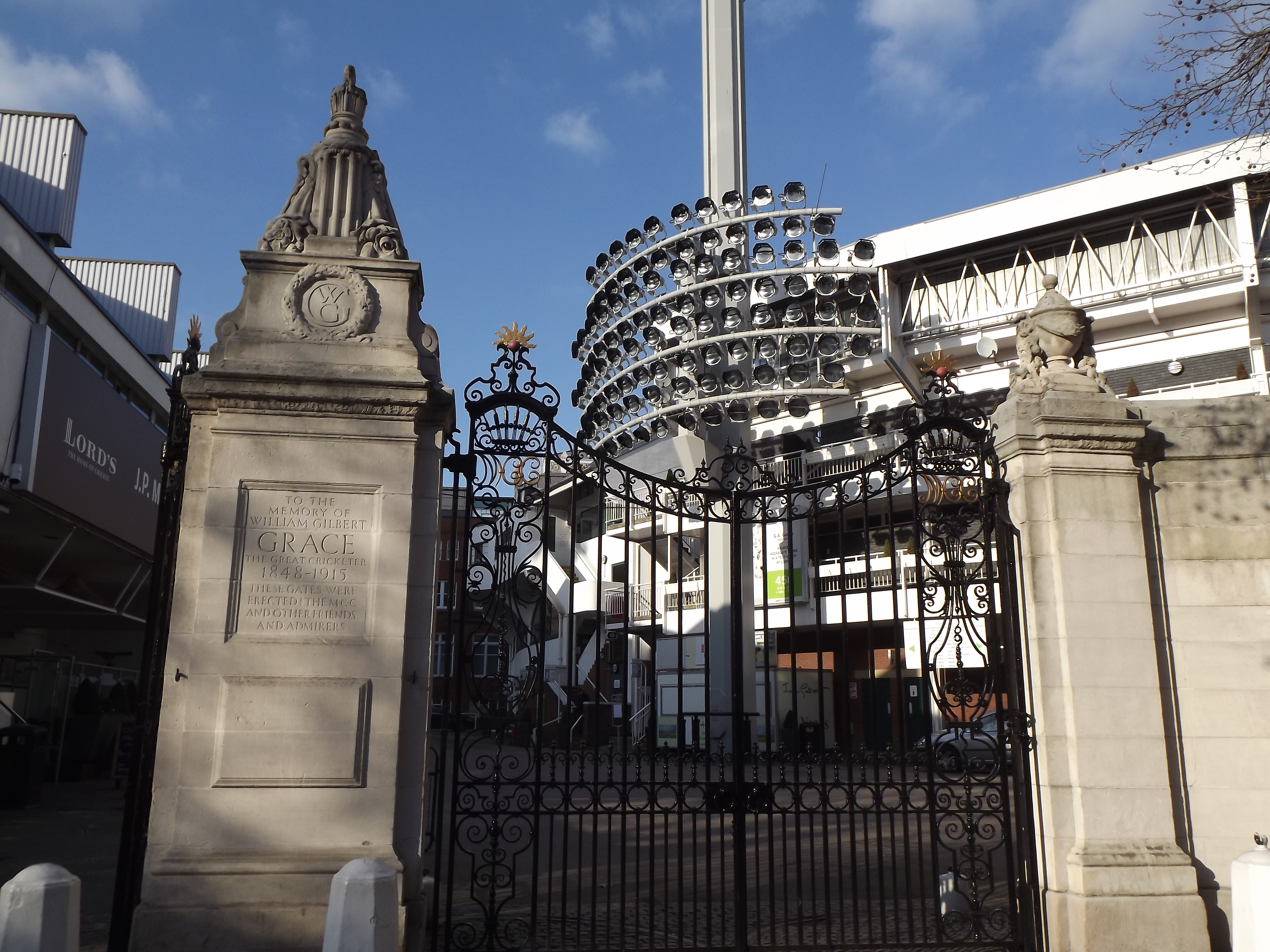
The right pair of gates in 2012

The Grace Gates, officially the W. G. Grace Memorial Gates, are two pairs of gates on St John's Wood Road at Lord's Cricket Ground in London, England. They were erected in 1923 and the gates with their flanking walls and piers became a Grade II listed building in 1996.

== Design ==
The Grace Gates were designed by architect Sir Herbert Baker as a tribute to English cricketer W. G. Grace, who had died in 1915. They replaced an earlier, less decorative, entrance to the ground. Baker also designed the old Lord's Grandstand, which was demolished in 1996.

The gates are made of cast iron and bear motifs of a cricket ball and the sun's rays, and the initials of the Marylebone Cricket Club. They are set within the south exterior wall of Lord's on St John's Wood Road, within a curved recess (or exedra) of Portland stone, which also contains a door to either side for pedestrian access. The two pairs of gates are separated from each other by a pillar made of Portland stone, topped by a stone carving of three stumps and urn, with a further pillar to either side, also topped by a stone urn. On the centre pillar is a carved wreath with the initials WGG, and the engraved inscription TO THE MEMORY OF WILLIAM GILBERT GRACE THE GREAT CRICKETER: 1848–1915: THESE GATES WERE ERECTED: THE MCC AND OTHER FRIENDS AND ADMIRERS.

The inscription was a matter of some debate, with various suggestions made in English, Latin and Greek. Sir Stanley Jackson suggested including "The Great Cricketer" in the design.

== History ==
The Grace Gates were officially opened by Sir Stanley Jackson at a ceremony in 1923. They are located close to the west end of the Tavern Stand, and are the main entrance to Lord's for MCC members, who often queue outside the gates hours before Lord's opens on the day of a Test match to get a good seat in the Lord's Pavilion.

The "Toffs and Toughs" photograph, of two boys in Harrow School uniform and three others in the plain clothes of pre-war working class youths, was taken outside the Grace Gates in July 1937. A protest was held outside the Grace Gates in 1970, opposing the 1969–70 South Africa rugby union tour of Britain and Ireland because of South Africa's apartheid policies. The Grace Gates were listed in 1996.

In 2013, as part of a revised redevelopment of Lord's, it was announced that a new entrance would be built into Lord's to supersede the Grace Gates as the entrance for MCC members. The gates themselves would be locked for three years while the pavilion end is redeveloped.
