= Toffs and Toughs =

1937 photograph

Toffs and Toughs (1937)

Toffs and Toughs is a 1937 photograph of five English boys: two dressed in the Harrow School uniform including waistcoat, top hat, boutonnière, and cane; and three nearby wearing the plain clothes of pre-war working class youths. The picture was taken by Jimmy Sime on 9 July 1937 outside the Grace Gates at Lord's Cricket Ground during the Eton v Harrow cricket match. It has been reproduced frequently as an illustration of the British class system, although the name "Toffs and Toughs" may be no older than 2004.

== The day of the picture ==
The Harrovians were Peter Wagner and Thomas Norwood Armitage "Tim" Dyson, who had arranged to be at Grace Gates at 2 pm, where Wagner's father would collect them and drive them to Russ Hill, the Wagners' country home in Surrey, for the weekend. The boys were in different school years and different houses, but their families were friends.

The other three boys were George Salmon, Jack Catlin, and George Young. All were 13-year-old pupils at the local Church of England school, St Paul’s Bentinck, that was a few minutes' walk away. They had visited the dentist that morning and decided to skip school to earn money at Lord's by carrying luggage and returning hired cushions for the deposit. The photographer, Jimmy Sime, worked for the Central Press Agency; Sime took several shots of the five boys outside Grace Gates. Ian Jack speculates that Sime solicited the cooperation of the three "toughs", but not that of the two "toffs".

== Use of the photograph ==
The picture first appeared the next day, 10 July 1937, on the front page of the News Chronicle, a left-wing newspaper, under the heading "Every picture tells a story". A different photograph from the same reel was printed in a photo-essay in Life on 2 August 1937; Life erroneously described Wagner and Dyson as "Young Etonians", and described the other three as "village boys". Ian Jack speculates that Life used an inferior shot because the original had been sold by the Central Press Agency exclusively to the News Chronicle.

The News Chronicle photograph reappeared in 1941 in Picture Post, illustrating an article by A. D. Lindsay arguing for reform of Britain's education system. Bert Hardy, who joined the Picture Post in 1941, has often been misidentified as the photographer who took the picture, which has been reused often in subsequent decades. In 1979, it was a plate in François Bédarida's Social history of England, captioned "The Two Nations". It was the illustration on the covers of books about the British class system published in the 1990s, and in newspaper articles in the 2000s. Paul Barker of the Institute for Community Studies described the picture in 2000 as an "easy caricature" symbolising an obsolete social divide.

In 2004, the title "Toffs and Toughs" was used in the Getty Images online catalogue and for a jigsaw puzzle of the photograph. Ian Jack had criticised this title since Salmon, Catlin, and Young were not especially poor or disreputable but merely part of the respectable working-class majority of the time.

== The boys in later life ==
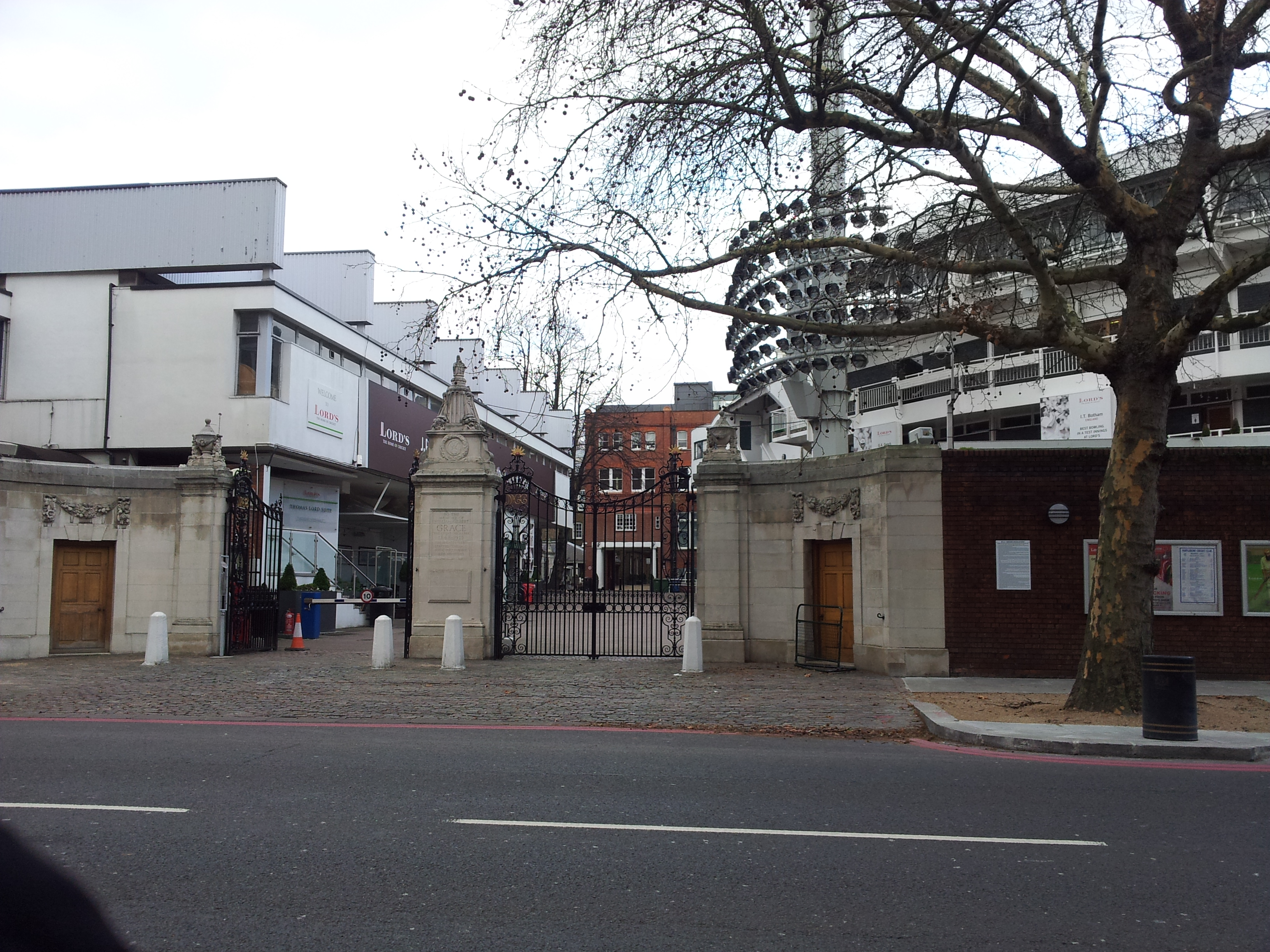
The W.G. Grace Gates, the location of the photograph, in 2012. In the original photograph, the boys were standing by the bollard to the left of the left pair of gates.

St Paul’s Bentinck pupils

Jack Catlin's family moved to Rickmansworth soon after 1937. He joined the Civil Service after leaving school. In 2010, he was widowed, had remarried and was living in Weymouth. He died in January 2011 at the age of 85, survived by his wife Sheila, his son, daughter, and grandchildren.

During the Second World War, George Salmon served as an anti-aircraft gunner on board HMS Duckworth. After the war, he worked for Rightons Limited, a metal supplier. He died in 2000.

In 1998, Young and Salmon, by then in their 70s, were asked if they had resented the boys in the Harrow School uniforms. "Nah," Young replied. "We had our lives, they had theirs.” Salmon said, "In those days you accepted what you were and what they were, and got on with it."

Harrow pupils

Tim Dyson died of diphtheria 13 months after the photograph was taken, in August 1938. This was shortly after travelling to join his parents in Trimulgherry, British India, where his father, Lieutenant-Colonel George St. John Armitage Dyson, was serving as an army officer. George Dyson died in 1942 in a Japanese prisoner-of-war camp in Korea.

Peter Wagner studied natural sciences at Peterhouse, Cambridge. In September 1943, he was commissioned as a 2nd lieutenant in the Royal Corps of Signals. However, he suffered from pericarditis and never saw active service during the Second World War. After being discharged from the army in 1945, he entered the family stockbroking firm, married, and had three daughters; he became mentally unstable in the 1970s and died in Hellingly Hospital in 1984.
