= Toff =

British stereotype of snobby aristocrat

In British English slang, a toff is a stereotype for someone with an aristocratic background or belonging to the landed gentry, particularly someone who exudes an air of superiority. For instance, the Toff, a character from the series of adventure novels by John Creasey, is an upper-class crime sleuth who uses a common caricature of a toff – a line drawing with a top hat, monocle, bow-tie and cigarette with a holder – as his calling card.

The word "toff" is thought to come from the word "tuft", which was a gold tassel worn by titled undergraduates at the University of Oxford or the University of Cambridge. The Old English word "toforan" has a meaning of "superiority".

Ian Kelly's book, Beau Brummell: The Ultimate Dandy, page 159, says it derives from the brown liquid that dripped from an upper class gentleman's nose after taking snuff (as in the adjective "toffee-nosed").

Hooray Henry has a similar meaning.

== See also ==
- Nobby
- Plebs
- Toffs and Toughs
