= The Unexpected Items =

British sketch comedy group

The Unexpected Items is a sketch comedy group based in London, United Kingdom.

Established in 2008 at Oxford University by a group of students including Matt Lacey, their shows include a series of short sketches and songs that cover a range of topics from frivolous wordplay to satirical interpretations of current trends.

The Unexpected Items have performed in a variety of venues from pub theatres such as The King's Head Theatre to the 420-seat Leicester Square Theatre and performed at the 2010 Glastonbury Festival. One of their sketches, Gap Yah acted by Matt Lacey, became a YouTube sensation in 2010, and the Gap Yah catchphrase gained popularity in schools and universities around the country. In June 2010 Sugarbox Records released the official Gap Yah single entitled ‘Gap Yah’ feat. The Banter.

== Members ==
- Sophie Alderson
- Matt Lacey
- Adam Reeve
- Tom Williams
