= Hooray Henry =

Pejorative British English slang term

Hooray Henry or Hoorah Henry is a pejorative term in British English slang, comparable to "toff", for an upper-middle class or upper class man who exudes loud-mouthed arrogance and an air of superiority, often flaunting his public school upbringing. It is cited as the male equivalent of a "Sloane Ranger", although the female equivalent of a Hooray Henry is sometimes referred to as a Hooray Henrietta.

Coined as "Hoorah Henry" in 1936 by Eric Partridge, it became common in the United Kingdom by the 1950s when it was originally used to refer to the boisterous upper class fans of jazz trumpeter Humphrey Lyttelton who would shout "Hoorah!" between pieces he performed at the 100 Club in London. More recently, the term has become commonly used in British tabloid newspapers to express contempt towards the lifestyles of the upper class and their privileged upbringings in expensive public schools such as Eton College, and esteemed universities such as Oxford and Cambridge (commonly called “Oxbridge”).

In both the United Kingdom and the United States, the term has frequently been used in a political context to refer to certain members of the British Conservative Party, including former Prime Ministers David Cameron and Boris Johnson, who had such an upbringing, and has also been used negatively towards those associated with events such as the University Boat Race and Royal Ascot. Despite its generally negative connotation, several restaurants, clubs and boutiques have adopted the name in a more favourable light to imply class and style.

== Definitions ==
Eric Partridge describes a Hooray Henry as a "male of the upper classes who exhibits a superior or anti-social manner". The Cambridge Dictionary defines one as a "young man from a high social class who speaks loudly and behaves in a noticeable way in public." In the Cassell Dictionary of Slang (1998), Jeff Grant defines a Hooray Henry as a "rich young man given to much public exhibitionism, drunkenness and similar antisocial activities, all based on an excess of snobbish self-esteem." Chambers Dictionary simply defines the term as "a young middle - or upper class man with a loud voice and ineffectual manner".

The term has a similar meaning to "toff" and "rugger bugger" and is seen as the male equivalent of "Sloane Ranger". It is usually applied to a snobbish, arrogant aristocratic male with a privileged public school and university (Oxford or Cambridge) background, or simply a wealthy, "well"-spoken, "well"-educated, but unbearably pompous male who believes he stands out among "lower" classes.

== Origins ==
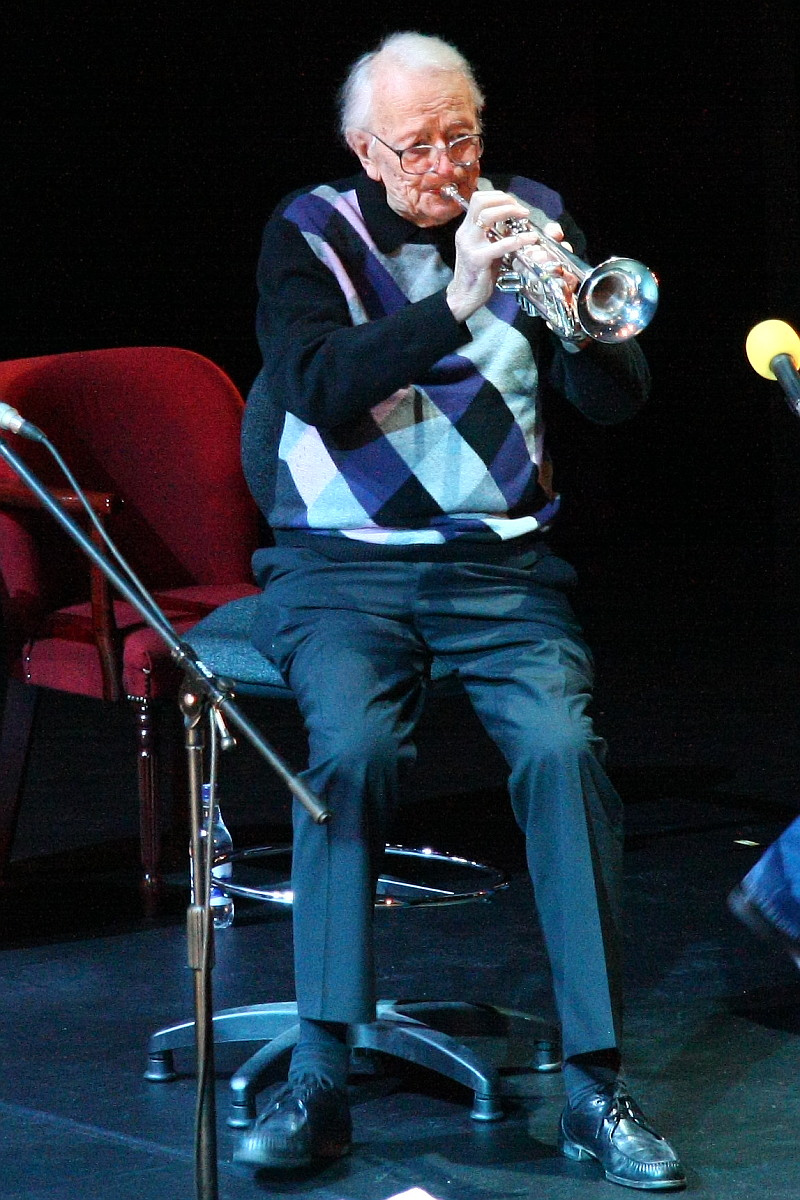
Use of the term "Hooray Henry" became common in Britain in the 1950s, originally to refer to the boisterous fans of jazz trumpeter Humphrey Lyttelton (pictured).

The term was originally coined as "Hoorah Henry" in 1936 by Eric Partridge, though Albert Jack (2006) has challenged the idea that Partridge made the term popular, crediting Jim Godbolt with the correct explanation of its popularity.

Jazz writer and historian Godbolt remembers that in 1951 it was used to refer to the fans of Old Etonian jazz trumpeter Humphrey Lyttelton, who would turn up in droves to the 100 Club in Oxford Street, London and shout in loud, upper class voices between songs, "Hooray!, Hooray!". Lyttelton has commented on the term but credits Damon Runyon with coining it. He stated in an interview, "In jazz circles, aggressively "upper class" characters are known as Hoorays, an adaption, I believe, of Damon Runyon's "Hooray Henries".

For the English language specialist David Crystal, the term is usually given to the "loud-mouthed ineffectual upper class twit". He explains that it began appearing in British literature in the 1950s, although the Americans then "seemed to lose track of the term". As a result, it was often included in British English guides in order to assist Americans. By the 1960s, the term was likened to Sloane Rangers, a term later applied to women such as Lady Diana Spencer before she married Prince Charles.

== Usage ==
The term is frequently used in tabloid newspapers and people continue to use "Hooray Henry" to refer to somebody of the upper class even outside the UK, although it is most commonly used in British English slang. British tabloids and American newspapers such as The Huffington Post often use the term "Toff" or "Hooray Henry" to describe the elite of the British Conservative Party; a 2012 article for instance referred to British Prime Minister David Cameron and the Tories as "Cameron and the Hooray Henry brigade".

Other institutions have a reputation for having a "Hooray Henry" image. The participants and viewers of the University Boat Race are frequently referred to as Hooray Henries or toffs, even in non-tabloid media like The Guardian, where in a 2013 opinion piece, the author expressed that it is "easy to sneer at the kind of event where triumphant, red trouser-wearing hooray-henrys greet their returning heroes with a rousing rendition of the timeless rowing shanty I'd Rather Be a Leper Than a Cam".

A 2013 CNN opinion piece spoke of the "Barbour jacket-wearing 'hooray-henry' crowd", posing the question as to whether the boat race was a "prestigious battle, a vulgar display of elitism, or the ultimate meritocracy." A 2005 Wales Online article reported on how the Countryside Alliance were acutely aware of their "Hooray Henry" image and that they were very keen to change their image and how they were perceived in Wales.

The upper-class people who turn up at horseracing events, particularly Royal Ascot, have also often been cited as Hoorah Henries. The journalist Robert Chesshyre spoke of the "Hooray Henry world of polo, gatecrasher balls and indolent ostentation at Ascot and Henley" in his 1987 book The Return of a Native Reporter.

In 2011, the London Evening Standard mocked the debauchery by the Hooray Henries of King's Road, Chelsea during the economic recession. Richard Godwin remarked:

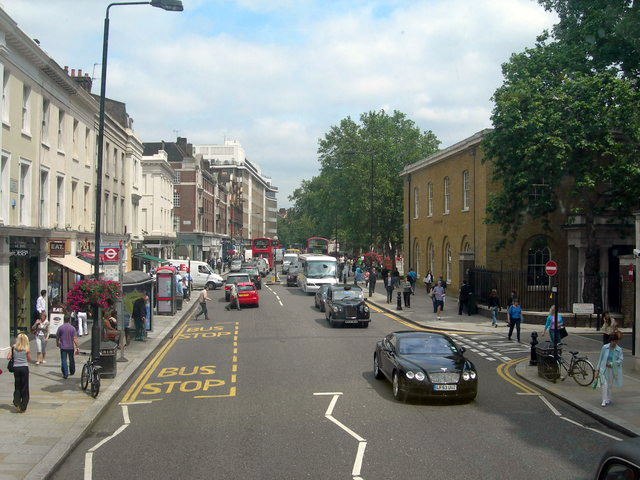
King's Road in Chelsea, London has often been cited as a playground for the "Hooray Henries and Henriettas".

"At a time when the economy teeters towards a double dip and their immediate peers are taking to the streets to rage against rising costs of education, a hopeless jobs market and dim prospects of affording a home, one set is partying like there's no tomorrow. They're not the ones who may actually have no tomorrow, though there is a distant worry that their privileged place in London society is under threat. Mostly, the Public kids - or the Jack Wills Generation, taking that 'outfitters to the gentry' at its word - are above these concerns... They are in their late teens and early twenties, fresh out of Eton, Charterhouse, Harrow and Stowe and revelling in the freedom from institution. Many of them are unemployed, or 'funemployed', as they like to call it."

The cast of the series Made in Chelsea with their privileged upbringings and glamorous lifestyles, who inhabit some of London's wealthiest areas including King's Road, Belgravia and Knightsbridge, have also been referred to as Hooray Henries; Glamour Magazine cites one of its stars as having a "wardrobe comprised entirely of custom-made suits" and "many luxury pads across the globe".

In the Prince Harry's 2023 legal case against the Mirror Group Newspapers, the Duke revealed that he found the 2007 Sunday Mirror article entitled "Hooray Harry's Dumped" to be "hurtful, to say the least" because it was a reference to celebrating the demise of his relationship. But it was then pointed out by the Mirror Group's lawyer that the article's headline was actually a referencing the article in which a friend said Davy had "just got tired of his hooray lifestyle." Going on to explain that "It’s not celebrating the demise of your relationship." Harry replied: "I'm not entirely sure when Hooray Harry began. If it had been used before or not, for me as the subject or victim of this, to see that word used in this term is hurtful."

== In retail ==
Though the term's usage is generally limited to the UK, David Crystal notes that the term is in use in India, but is sometimes used in a less derogatory context to describe a man of class and style; he states that a clothing line in Kolkata used the banner "Hoorah Henry" to promote a fashionable men's clothing line.

Restaurants, clubs, and boutiques have embraced the term more favourably to indicate class, including Hooray Henry's Restaurant and Hooray Henry's Boutique in Great Yarmouth in England and Hooray Henry's restaurant in West Hollywood, California in the US. A Coventry-based firm, Hooray Henry's Cars, plays upon the name and rents out chauffeur-driven Rolls-Royces and Jaguars for weddings.

The 2024 United Kingdom general election had a candidate for the constituency of Ely and East Cambridgeshire who identified as "HENRY, Hoo-Ray" entered under the MRLP (Monster Raving Loony Party). He won 271 votes (0.5% of the total cast): more than the Social Democratic Party and two candidates who stood as Independents

== See also ==
- Yuppie, a term coined in the early 1980s for a young professional person working in a city.
