= Schöffel (company) =

Clothing company

- Industry: Outdoor clothing
- Founded: 1804
- Headquarters: Schwabmünchen, Germany
- Revenue: 74.5 million euros (2020)
- Number of employees: 218 (2024)
- Website: schoeffel.de

Schöffel GmbH & Co. KG (written as SCHÖFFEL) was founded in 1804 in Schwabmünchen, Bavaria, as a textile trading company. It is still run in the same city today as a medium-sized family business. Schöffel is one of Europe's leading brands in functional outdoor and ski clothing. The company made a name for itself in the 1980s through the innovative development of Gore-Tex products. It is one of the few large clothing companies in Germany to have its own in-house tailoring department. The collections are developed at the headquarters, from design to production. Schöffel Sportbekleidung GmbH is a wholly owned subsidiary of Schöffel GmbH & Co. KG, the holding company of the Schöffel group of companies.

== History ==
The company was founded in 1804 by Georg Schöffel, who initially sold stockings, socks, and nightcaps as a travelling salesman. In the early 19th century, he built up a customer base in the Schwabmünchen area and laid the foundation for a long-lasting textile business. After receiving an annuity for life from the crown prince of Bavaria in 1809, Georg Schöffel established a stationary textile business in the city of Schwabmünchen.

In 1950, the company opened its own clothing store in Schwabmünchen, which served as a showcase for the product range.

By 1975, the company had become a market leader in the field of hiking clothing in Germany.

In 1983, Schöffel stated selling Gore-Tex products for the first time, of which the first batch of 24.000 jackets sold out very quickly.

In 2021, alongside a structural reorganisation of Schöffel, which aimed to help with the internationalisation of the company and the development of new business areas, the management was expanded to include three instead of two persons.

At the beginning of 2025, Jakob Schöffel took over the management of the Schöffel Group in its eighth generation.

The company slogan "Ich bin raus" (I'm out) has been used as the brand's central theme since at least 2014. The slogan was interpreted ambiguously as an allusion to outdoor products on the one hand and a slower-paced lifestyle on the other.

== Joint venture/franchising ==
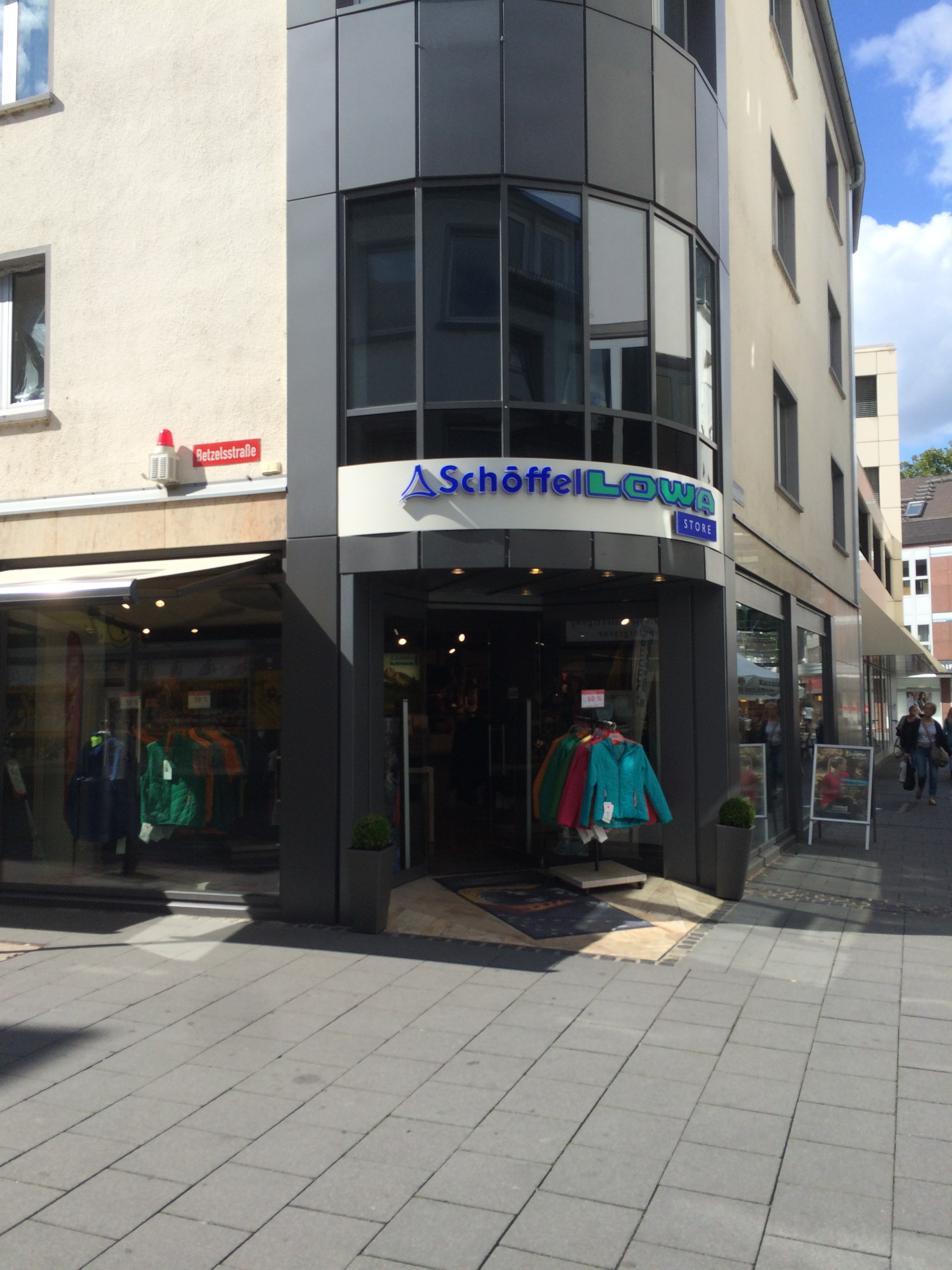
Schöffel-Lowa store in Mainz, September 2015

In 2003, Schöffel entered into a joint venture with Lowa Sportschuhe, a manufacturer of hiking, ski, and mountaineering boots. The joint venture Schöffel-Lowa Sportartikel GmbH & Co. KG operates a total of 37 Schöffel-Lowa stores, most of which are run by franchise partners (31 in Germany, four in Austria and two in South Tyrol, Italy; as of March 2022). Since 2019, Schöffel has also offered ski clothing rental through Intersport stores.

== Sponsorship ==
Since 2009, the company has been a cooperation partner of the Austrian Ski Association (ÖSV), supplying the Alpine Republic's alpine teams with racing and leisurewear. As an official partner of the Austrian Olympic Committee, it also provides the appropriate equipment to athletes and coaches participating in the Winter Games. The company also sponsors, among others, extreme mountaineers Gerlinde Kaltenbrunner and Ralf Dujmovits.

== Criticism ==
Research conducted by the Clean Clothes Campaign in 2010 revealed that several companies in the outdoor clothing industry - including Schöffel - were paying their employees in Asia and Central America low wages despite high profit margins. In addition, working conditions in the factories were poor. The non-governmental organisation concluded that 'there is a painful gap between the image and reality of the outdoor industry'.

The entrepreneurial family around Peter Schöffel also participated with 5 million euros in Cum/Ex transactions, which cost the German state billions in alleged tax refunds that were never actually paid.

== Commitment to sustainability and social issues ==
Schöffel responded to criticism regarding its supply chain and joined the Fair Wear Foundation in 2011, which is dedicated to monitoring working conditions in manufacturing countries. The company's own Schöffel Code of Conduct was thus supplemented by the Code of Labour Practice. Since the beginning of 2013, the company has also been a Bluesign system partner for the sustainable production of textiles. The company has published a sustainability report for 2024. By 2030, CO_{2} emissions, including those from supply chains, are to be halved, and new products are being developed with recyclability in mind.
