= Bean boots =

Type of footwear

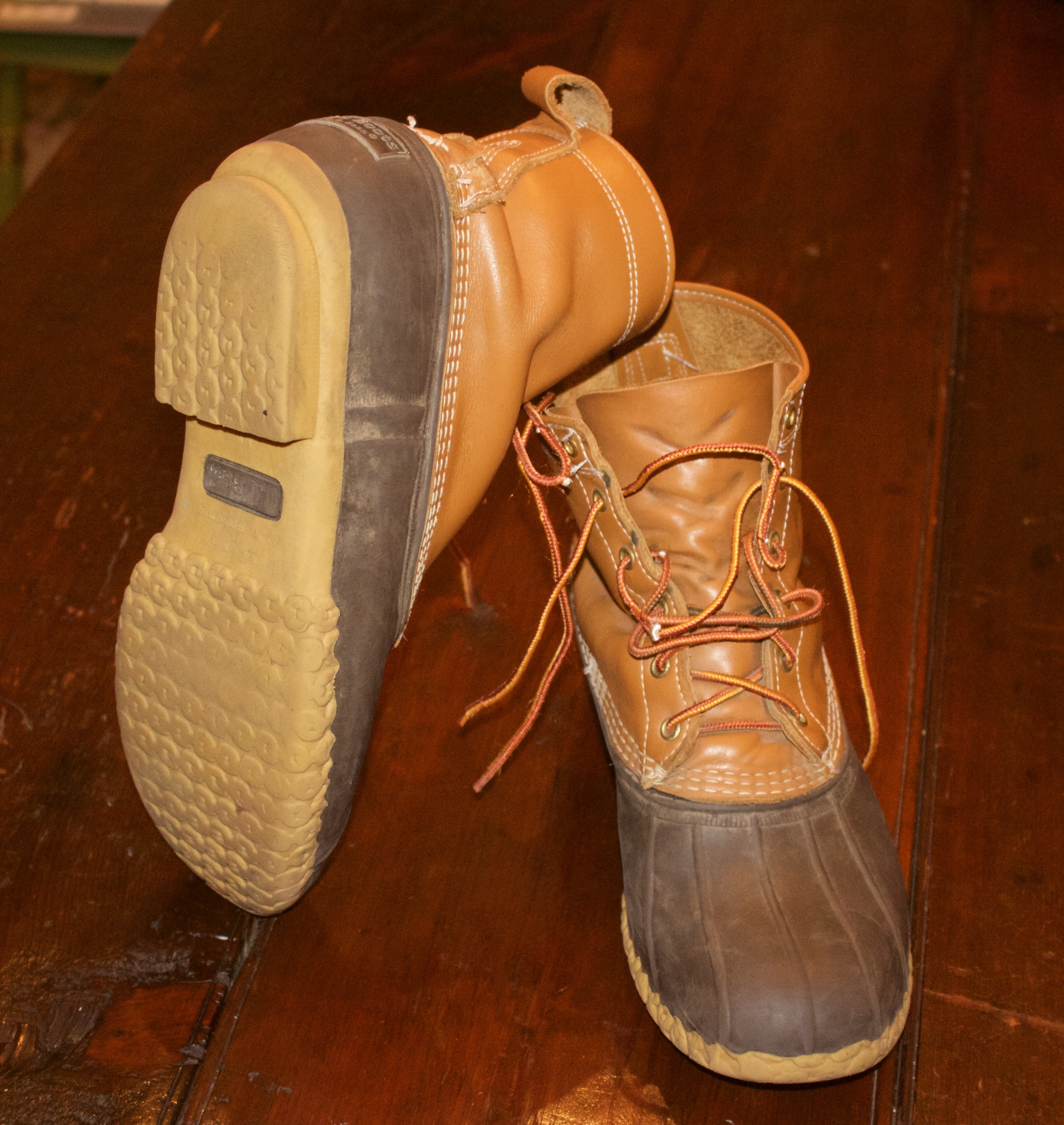
A pair of Bean Boots

Bean boots (originally named Maine Hunting Shoes) are a type of water-resistant "duck boots" manufactured by L.L.Bean. They are constructed from a rubber sole and a leather upper. The boots were created in 1911 and were an instant success. The boots became an item of clothing connected to elite prep schools. In the 2010s, the boots experienced a resurgence in popularity leading to a shortage, as demand exceeded production capacity.

== Creation ==
The first pairs of Bean Boots were created in 1911. Leon Leonwood Bean was an avid outdoorsman and hunter from Freeport, Maine. On one of his hunting trips, Bean noticed that his feet were getting wet and cold in his usual pair of hunting boots. He decided to combine the rubber soles of rain boots with leather uppers, and convinced a local cobbler to assemble the shoes. In 1912, Bean formed the L.L. Bean Company to market and sell the shoes.

While the first 100 pairs of the boots sold quickly, they had a defect in the connection between the rubber and the leather. Bean returned all of his customers' money, and convinced US Rubber to make specialty soles for his boots. After the switch to the specialty soles, the boots were an instant success. The only subsequent change to the boots was the addition of a chain pattern design in 1947.

== Fashion ==
Bean Boots are considered to be part of prep fashion due to their classic design and use at elite prep schools in New England. The Official Preppy Handbook calls them "the second most important shoe (after Weejun loafers) in the preppy male's wardrobe." In the 2010s, the boots became trendy. This has led to widespread shortages of the shoes. While some suspected that the shortage was manufactured, the company maintained that it is because the shoes are still made in Maine and stitched by hand, and points to the price not changing as evidence that they weren't taking advantage of the trend.

== See also ==
- List of shoe styles
- Bootmobile
