= Leon Gorman =

American businessman

Leon Arthur Gorman
- Born: December 20, 1934; Nashua, New Hampshire, United States
- Died: September 3, 2015 (aged 80); Yarmouth, Maine, United States
- Education: Bowdoin College
- Known for: Presidency & Chairmanship of L.L.Bean

Leon Arthur Gorman (December 20, 1934 – September 3, 2015) was an American businessman. He was the president and chairman of the board for the clothing and outdoor recreation equipment company L.L. Bean. An active philanthropist, Gorman became the wealthiest person living in the state of Maine.

== Career ==
Gorman was born in Nashua, New Hampshire, in 1934. A graduate of Bowdoin College, Gorman began working at the company after three years of Navy destroyer service and a trainee job at Filene's department store. Gorman became president in 1967, after his grandfather Leon Leonwood Bean died. From that time until his presidency ended in 2001, Gorman helped pioneer the company's mail order business and saw an average annual 20% growth rate for the company. In 2001, Gorman decided to take the position of chairman of the board, leaving the position of CEO to Christopher McCormick, the first non-family member to assume the title, and in 2013, he became Chairman Emeritus when his nephew, Shawn Gorman, succeeded him as chairman.

== Personal ==
Gorman was an active philanthropist, having made significant contributions in the public education sector. He was nominated trustee emeritus for Bowdoin College in 2002. In 2010, he was bestowed with the Bowdoin prize, an award given out every five years to the alumnus who has made the greatest contribution to the world.

Having had a reported net worth of $860 million, as of 2012, and again in 2014, he was the wealthiest person living in the state of Maine.

Gorman was an avid hiker and outdoorsmen. Gorman organized an annual camping trip with the companies' top executives, often hiking on rough terrain like the Presidential mountains.

== Death ==
Gorman died of cancer in Yarmouth, Maine, on September 3, 2015, aged 80. To honor his memory, L.L. Bean's flagship store closed for the first time since 1967. L.L.Bean announced a $125,000 donation to a new scholarship fund upon his death, representing more than two years of tuition at his alma mater, Bowdoin College.

== Books ==
- Gorman, Leon (2006). L.L. Bean: The Making of an American Icon. Harvard Business Review Press. ISBN 1578511836.
