= Nantucket Reds =

Style of trousers

Nantucket Reds are a style of trousers distributed by Murray's Toggery Shop on the island of Nantucket. The pants were featured in The Official Preppy Handbook.

== Description ==
Nantucket Reds were originally inspired by cotton trousers worn in Brittany. A characteristic of Reds is that they fade to a "dusty rose" as they age. Since their inception, the cotton canvas pants have been marketed as shorts. The distinctive salmon pink color has since been used on hats, shirts, sweaters and socks.

Reds are worn predominantly by summer residents of Nantucket, Martha's Vineyard, and Cape Cod in place of khakis or chinos. Because both Nantucket and Martha's Vineyard are popular vacation destinations for wealthy Northeasterners, reds have become associated with northeastern preppy style and culture as a type of go-to-hell pants. Reds are also commonly worn on Fire Island and the Hamptons.

== Distribution ==
Reds are produced by and distributed to the public by Murray's Toggery Shop, which is located on Main Street on the island of Nantucket, in Massachusetts. Nantucket Reds are marketed as "Guaranteed to Fade."
