= I.J.G.B. =

Nigerian slang and subculture

- Pronunciation: Eye-Jay-Gee-Bee
- Origin: Nigerian slang
- Meaning: A member of the Nigerian diaspora that has just returned to the country from abroad.

I.J.G.B. (I Just Got Back) is a Nigerian slang term for a member of the Nigerian diaspora that has just returned to the country after an extended period abroad. It is an acronym for the phrase I just got back, which is considered a common utterance by returnees that indicates their disconnect with Nigerians in the country.

== Usage ==
Sometimes described pejoratively, I.J.G.B.s are often regarded by other Nigerians as being indicative of the widening of Nigeria's diaspora and its wealth in the past thirty years. Prominent examples, like Eku Edewor and DJ Cuppy, typify the subclass as a whole.

Popular stereotypes from within the country about the speech, mentality, romantic methodology and relative affluence of Nigerian aristocrats and members of the bourgeoisie in general are all informed by how I.J.G.B.s – often their sons and daughters – are thought to behave.

== See also ==
- Bon chic bon genre
- Preppy
- Sloane Ranger
