= Nigerian aristocracy (disambiguation) =

Nigerian aristocracy may refer to:

- Nigerian traditional rulers, Nigeria's statutory monarchs
- Subordinate titleholders in the Nigerian chieftaincy system
- Members of the country's political elite, many of whom are holders of chiefly titles
- Members of the country's corporate elite, many of whom are holders of chiefly titles
