= BCBG =

BCBG may refer to:

== French phrase ==
- Bon chic bon genre (French for 'Good style, good class')

== Other ==
- Bon Chic Bon Genre, an album by Campag Velocet
- A women's clothing line created by Max Azria
