= Ann Barr =

British journalist and writer

Isabel Ann Barr (16 September 1929 – 4 May 2015) was a British journalist and writer involved in coining the terms Sloane Rangers and Foodies, in the early 1980s.

== Early life ==
Isabel Ann Barr was born in London to Andrew and Margaret Barr, who were Scottish and Canadian respectively. Her earliest years were spent in North Audley Street, Mayfair. At the outbreak of World War II, Barr and her three siblings were taken to Montreal by her mother where she attended The Study, a private school. She then returned to England in 1945 and attended St Margaret's boarding school, Ludlow, Shropshire (now Moor Park School). In 1950, the family moved to Belgravia. Her paternal grandfather was the inventor of Barr's Irn-Bru, a type of fizzy soda drink, popular in Scotland.

== Career ==
She began working in journalism working for John Anstey at the Telegraph Magazine and for Robert Harling at House & Garden, as well as helping Hugh Johnson, her cousin's husband, with his World Atlas Of Wine. She worked as a secretary at The Times and as a sub-editor at House and Garden magazine and the Weekend Telegraph magazine. She was features editor of Queen, then Harpers & Queen for which she was the deputy editor from 1971 to 1985. With Peter York, she co-wrote The Official Sloane Ranger Handbook which sold over a million copies. She followed up with The Official Foodie Handbook in 1984, co-written with Paul Levy. She was then Features editor of The Observer.

== Death ==
Barr died from complications of Alzheimer's disease in 2015, aged 85; she never married. From 2011, Barr lived in a nursing home in Pimlico, London.

== Bibliography ==
- The Official Sloane Ranger Handbook (1982), co-authored with Peter York; ISBN 978-0852232361, Ebury Press
- The Official Foodie Handbook (1984), co-authored with Paul Levy. ISBN 0 85223 348 5, Ebury Press
