= Your LL Bean Boyfriend =

Tumblr blog

An example of one of the entries on Your LL Bean Boyfriend

Your LL Bean Boyfriend is a Tumblr blog showing models from the L.L. Bean catalog with romantic captions. It was started as a joke but has spawned a companion blog named Your LL Bean Girlfriend and several imitators. The neologism has been used by the press to describe celebrities.

== History ==
The blog was created in December 2012 by Maine native Elizabeth Pride. She joked to her friends that her dream boyfriend was a man who looked like a LL Bean model. She explained that, due to her background as a Mainer, she found "outdoorsy" men in flannel and cable knit sweaters attractive. That night, she started the blog and wrote the first 60 entries. The blog's following grew quickly; before the end of the first week, it hit 4,500 followers on Tumblr and 25,000 shares on Facebook.

== Content ==
"He will build you a table and then have sex with you on it."

-Tagline

The blog features pictures from LL Bean's website in a golden picture frame. Each model is rugged-looking but well dressed in preppy clothing. Captions are often Maine-specific and refer to stereotypical Maine activities such as "antiquing in Wiscasset" and sea kayaking. Pride also receives comments from people who realize that their significant other is the type of person showcased on the blog.

== Reception ==
Your LL Bean Boyfriend was received positively by reviewers. Terri Pous of Time described the blog as a "delicious slice of the Tumblr pie". Several reviewers have drawn parallels between the blog and the Ryan Gosling "hey girl" meme. The press has used the term to describe Andrew Garfield.
