= Mason Wiley =

American author

- Born: Robert Mason Wiley; May 30, 1955; Nash County, North Carolina, U.S.
- Died: October 7, 1994 (aged 39); New York City, New York, U.S
- Education: Columbia University (BA)
- Alma mater: Episcopal High School
- Occupation: Writer
- Notable work: The Official Preppy Handbook

Robert Mason Wiley (May 30, 1955 – October 7, 1994) was an author who co-wrote The Official Preppy Handbook and Inside Oscar: The Unofficial History of the Academy Awards.

== Biography ==
Wiley was born in Nash County, North Carolina on May 30, 1955. He attended Episcopal High School in Alexandria, Virginia and graduated from Columbia University in 1977.

While working for the Columbia Daily Spectator, he met future film critic and historian Damien Bona, who later became his writing collaborator.

He was one of the four authors of The Official Preppy Handbook, a humorous, best-selling reference book on prep culture published in 1980. As the only southerner among the writers, Wiley included Southern prep culture to offset the predominant New England vibes.

In 1986, he and Bona wrote a year-by-year account of the Academy Awards that took 4 years of writing and research, with a fourth edition published in 1993.

Wiley also was a critic for such publications as the New York Times, Los Angeles Times, New York Newsday, Cosmopolitan, Time, Entertainment Weekly and others.

On October 7, 1994, Wiley died from the complications of AIDS.
