= Preppy =

Modern, widespread subculture in the United States

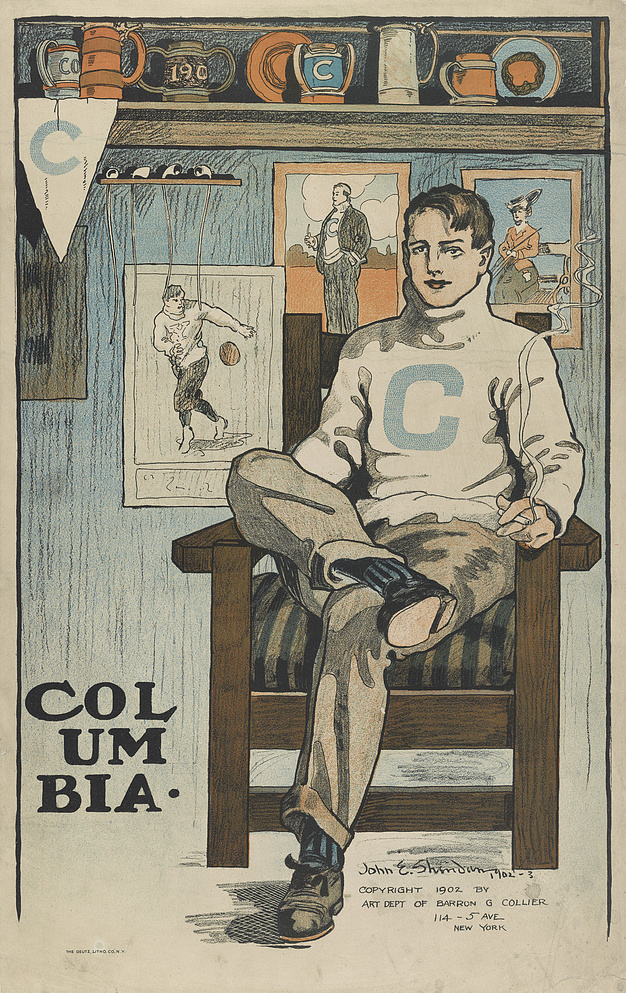
A 1902 illustration of a Columbia University student, containing many of the attributes stereotypically associated with the preppy subculture

Preppy (also spelled as preppie, or prep) is an American subculture associated with the alumni of college-preparatory schools in the Northeastern United States. The term, which is an abbreviation of "preparatory", is used to denote a person seen as characteristic of a student or alumnus of these schools. Characteristics of preppy individuals include a particular subcultural speech, vocabulary, dress, overall behavior, mannerisms and etiquette reflective of an upper class and old money upbringing.

== Definition ==
The term preppy originates from the private college-preparatory schools that some American upper class and upper middle class children attend. The term preppy is commonly associated with the Ivy League and broader group of oldest universities in the Northeast as well as the prep schools which brought students to them, since traditionally a primary goal in attending a prep school was admittance into one of these institutions. Preppy fashion derives from the fashions of these old Northeastern schools in the early to mid-twentieth century.

Lisa Birnbach's 1980 book The Official Preppy Handbook was written to poke fun at the rich lives of privileged Ivy League and socially elite liberal arts college students. It portrays the preppy social group as well-connected, and although exclusive, courteous to other social groups without fostering serious relationships with them. Being educated and well-connected is associated with an upper-class socioeconomic status that emphasizes higher education and high-income professional success. The book ended up fueling and influencing a resurgence of interest in preppy fashion in the 1980s.

== Fashion ==
For men, preppy fashion has its roots in, and substantially overlaps with, the "Ivy" style of dress, which originated in the early 1900's and had become widespread by the late 1950s. The "Ivy" style took its name from Ivy League universities where it originated. J. Press represented the quintessential purveyor of Ivy League style. In the mid-twentieth century, J. Press and Brooks Brothers both had stores on Ivy League school campuses, including Harvard, Princeton, Columbia, Yale, and Penn.

Ivy style was inspired by leisure activities commonly enjoyed by the upper-classes in the United Kingdom and northeastern United States (such as polo, sailing, hunting, fencing, crew rowing, lacrosse, golf, tennis, rugby, squash, and swimming). It adapted the sportswear associated with these activities as everyday wear and incorporated aspects of traditional British country clothing (tweed sport coat, brogues, etc.). Distinctly preppy fashions then emerged as a, still-more-casual, youthful interpretation of Ivy League style (rugby shirt, boat shoes, etc.). Thus, the sportswear, casual lifestyle apparel, and outdoor gear offered by retailers such as L.L. Bean in the Northeast (with its eponymous "Bean Boots") and Eddie Bauer in the Pacific Northwest came to form an important component of preppy style. Both outfitters, along with Vermont-based Orvis, were featured in The Official Preppy Handbook. The mostly tongue-in-cheek guide published in 1980 described L. L. Bean as "nothing less than Prep mecca." Their catalog was said to be "the biggest seller of the rugged New England Prep look."

By the 1980s, mass marketing of brands such as Ralph Lauren, Lacoste, Daniel Cremieux, and Izod brought a resurgence of Ivy and preppy styles and moved them into the mainstream.

Female preppy-influenced fashion emerged in the 1960s; a trend led by designers such as Perry Ellis and Lilly Pulitzer, influenced by designers such as Oleg Cassini, and popularized by female students at the Seven Sisters Colleges, sister institutions to the Ivy League. These classic ensembles of the 1960s and 1970s include tailored skirt suits, low heels, wrap dresses, shift dresses, silk or cotton blouses, and jewelry with a refined style. Such clothing drew on elements of typical preppy styles, such as pastel colours, or equestrian details and nautical styles, such as Breton stripes.

The Official Preppy Handbook points to daughters "borrowing the clothes her mother wore in Prep school. Before long, they share a charge account at The Talbots." The handbook also stated that "Behind the red door on every Talbots catalog cover is the best selection of women's Prep fashions anywhere." And that "the clothes here are a rare combination of Preppy, tasteful, and sophisticated." Though traditional interest in the preppy style generally fell in the 1990s, some of the newer outfitters such as Ralph Lauren, J. Crew, Tommy Hilfiger, Vineyard Vines, Gant, and Elizabeth McKay are often perceived as having preppy styles, with designers such as Marc Jacobs and Luella Bartley adding the preppy style into their clothes in the 1990s.

Examples of preppy wardrobe staples include:

- Navy blazers with brass buttons;
- Casual button-down shirts, particularly Oxford Cloth Button Down Shirts (or "O.C.B.D.");
- Repp stripe and silk knit neckties;
- Sweaters (as opposed to sweatshirts, windbreakers, etc.), particularly those with cable knitting, argyle patterns, or a university name/logo;
- Grosgrain ("ribbon"), surcingle, and woven leather belts;
- Seersucker and madras cloth (particularly for sport jackets and Bermuda shorts);
- Gray flannel, chino cloth, and corduroy trousers;
- Nantucket reds and other go-to-hell pants;
- Loafers (particularly penny loafers)
- Derby shoes made of buckskin
- Polo shirts and rugby shirts
- Boat shoes and other moccasin-style shoes

== See also ==
- Bon chic bon genre
- Filthy Preppy Teens
- Greaser
- Fuerdai
- I.J.G.B.
- International Debutante Ball
- Jock
- Kogal
- Nerd
- Old money
- School uniform
- Sloane Ranger
- Yuppie
- Paninaro
- Popper (Jugendkultur)
