= Damien Bona =

American film historian (1955–2012)

Damien Conrad Bona (March 18, 1955 – January 29, 2012) was an American film historian, writer, film critic and journalist. Bona co-authored the 1986 reference book, "Inside Oscar: The Unofficial History of the Academy Awards," a definitive history of the Academy Awards with Mason Wiley, a former classmate at Columbia University. In 1982, Bona quit his job as a Manhattan lawyer and moved to Los Angeles, where he and Wiley embarked on extensive research to write a reference guide to Oscar history from the first ceremony in 1929. Much of the research was conducted at the Academy of Motion Picture Arts and Sciences library in Beverly Hills, California. The two missed their original publication deadline of November 1982. They submitted the final copy two years later with updates on the 1985 Academy Awards. Co-author Wiley died of Aids in 1994. Bona was the sole author of the book's sequel, "Inside Oscar 2," which was released in 2002 and covered the Academy Awards from 1995 through 2000.

Bona was born March 18, 1955 during a heavy snow storm in Sharon, Connecticut, and raised in New Milford. He graduated from the Portsmouth Abbey School in 1973. He earned a bachelor's degree in English in 1977 from Columbia University, where he worked as a film critic for the university newspaper, the Columbia Daily Spectator. He earned a law degree from the New York University School of Law in 1980. He worked as a lawyer in Manhattan for two years before resigning and temporarily moving to Los Angeles where he and Mason Wiley began researching their book on the Academy Awards. After their research in Los Angeles, both Bona and Wiley moved back to New York City.

Bona is the author of two other books, "Opening Shots: The Unusual, Unexpected, Potentially Career Threatening First Roles That Launched the Careers of 70 Hollywood Stars" (1994) and "Starring John Wayne as Genghis Kahn: Hollywood's All-Time Worst Casting Blunders" (1996).

After suffering sudden cardiac arrest on January 14, 2012, Bona died from its complications in Manhattan on January 29, 2012, at the age of 56.
