= Social class in Nigeria =

Social structure in Nigeria

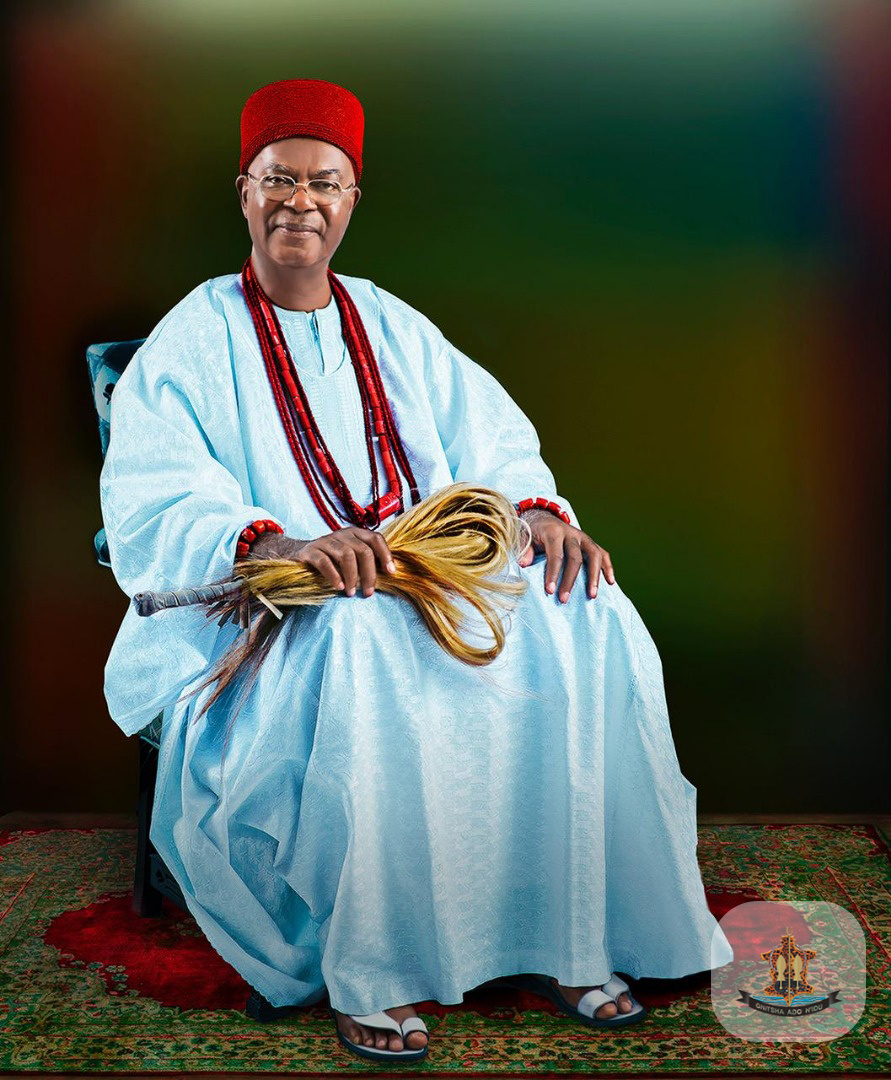
Alfred Achebe, king of Onitsha and chair of the board of Unilever.

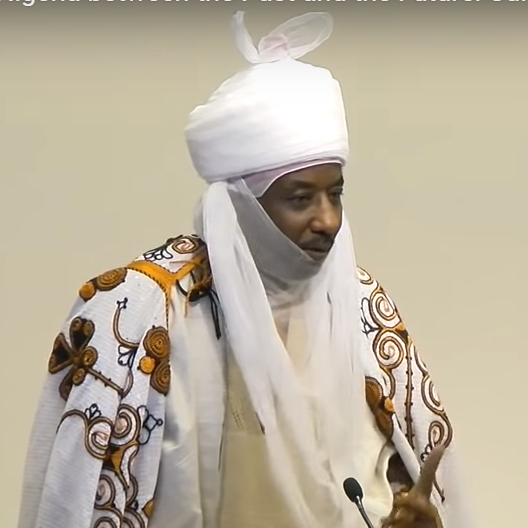
Sanusi Lamido Sanusi, king of the Kano Emirate and non-executive director of the MTN Group.

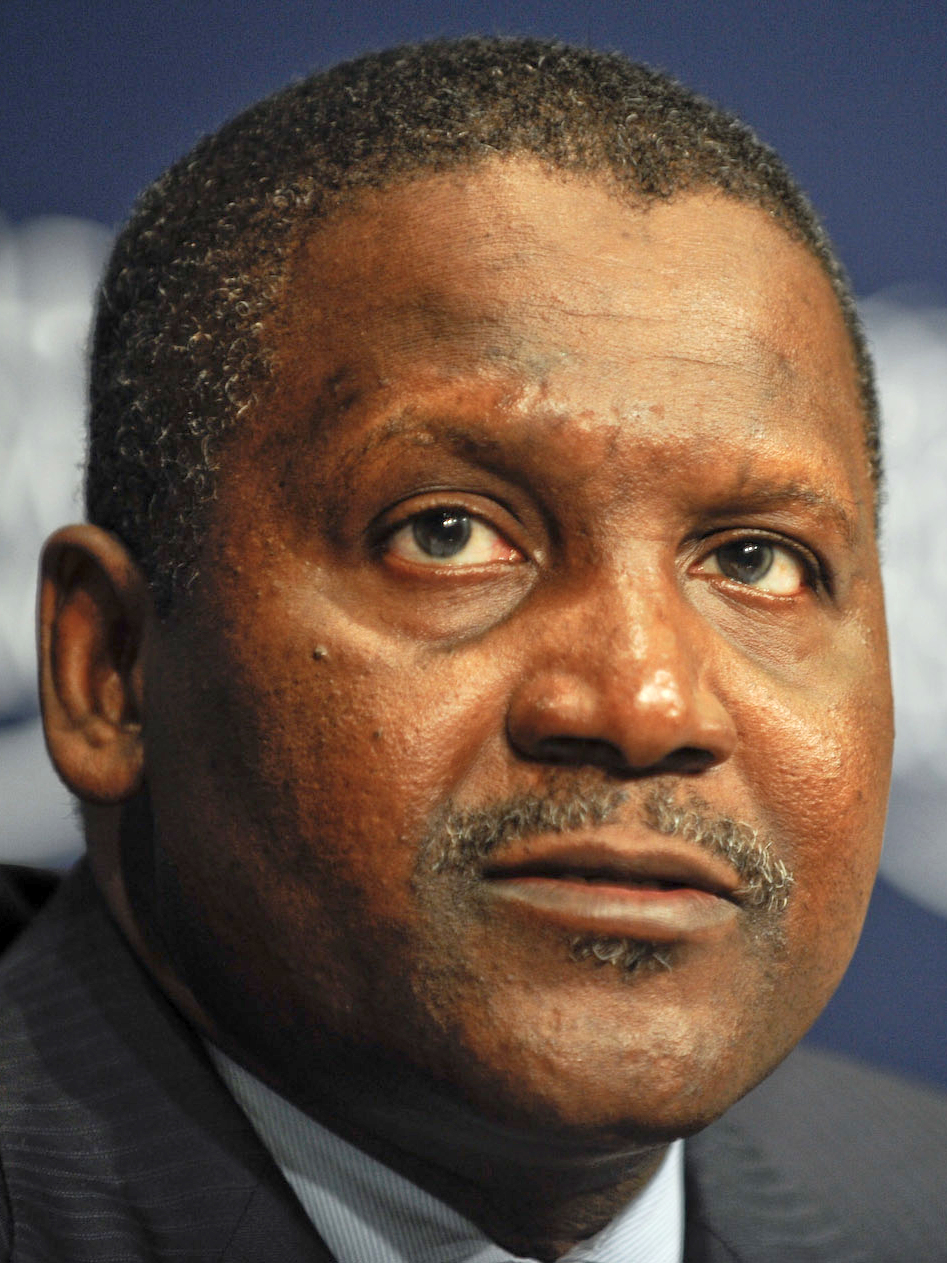
Aliko Dangote, chief executive of the Dangote Group and Nigeria's richest man.

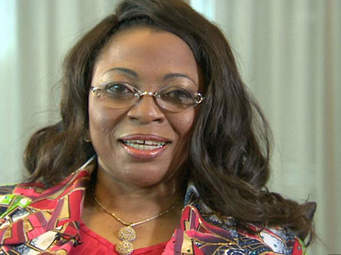
Folorunsho Alakija, vice-chair of Famfa Oil Limited and Nigeria's richest woman.

The social structure in Nigeria is the hierarchical characterization of social status, historically stratified under the Nigerian traditional rulers and their subordinate chiefs, with a focus on tribe and ethnicity which continued with the advent of colonization.

Since independence, however, it has become increasingly characterized by the gradual shift towards wealth, income, education, type of occupation, and most recently specific subcultures amongst the youth.

== Classification ==
Some social critics have adopted the Marxist view of class in which individuals are classified by their relationship to the means of production, and are thus members of either the middle class, or bourgeoisie, or the working and underclasses, or proletariat. This is regarded by such people as the most important factor in a person's social rank. The middle class, or bourgeoisie, traditionally occupies an intermediate position in the Nigerian class hierarchy. In the past two centuries it has risen in power, however, aided by modernization and Westernization respectively. The working and underclasses, or proletariat, collectively make up the greater proportion of the country's population. There is considerable overlap between these two latter classes, as individuals tend to move from one to the other as their situations change over time.

== History ==
=== Pre-colonial Nigeria ===
The traditional upper class is made up of the members of the Nigerian chieftaincy system. The country's oldest continuously existing institution, the chieftaincy is the only class that is officially recognized by Nigeria's government. Many chieftaincy sub-systems from the Nigerian region include titled positions for merchants in their structures, and have done so for centuries. An example of this is the Iyaloja title amongst the Yoruba people.

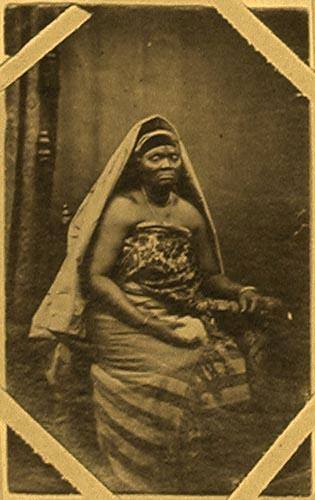
Efunroye Tinubu, an aristocrat who served as the princess consort of Oba Adele Ajosun of Lagos and the paramount chieftess of Egbaland.

Although the holders of this and other titles would therefore belong more to the Nigerian chieftaincy system than they would to a distinct upper middle class, their existence in the pre-colonial period nevertheless set the scene for the subsequent development of one. Some bourgeois members of later generations, such as Chief Candido da Rocha, would ultimately be ennobled as members of the said system by way of them.

Old methods of stratification prevailed during this era. In addition to the chiefs, Nigerian society was composed of both free and enslaved individuals that were ranked beneath them. Social mobility was largely static, though rising through the ranks (from slave to free person, and from free person to chief) was technically possible in many tribes for much of the country's pre-colonial history.

=== Colonial Nigeria ===
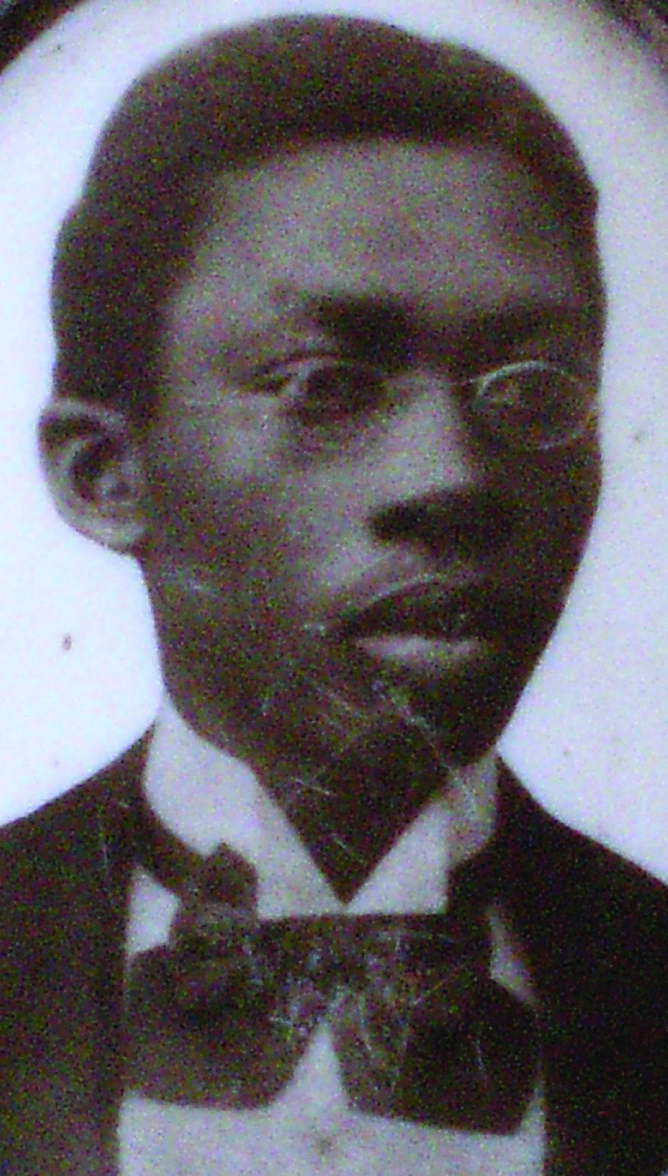
William Vivour, a wealthy Saro trader and planter.

Following the abolition of the slave trade by the British, freed slaves were settled by them along the West African coast. The British annexation of Lagos in 1861 and the subsequent promotion of legitimate trade benefited the community of such people in Nigeria, known as the Saro and the Amaro, and they soon became a rising middle class through trading with their benefactors thereafter. They were formally educated, utilized a western style of dressing, owned race horses and organized waltzes, square dances and musical soirees where Molière was performed. Mr. R.B. Blaize (a Saro) and the aforementioned Chief Da Rocha (an Amaro) both typified this emergent class with their indigenous philanthropic efforts.

Outside of this community in particular, other people also engaged in trade on a large scale and joined it in becoming members of what was rapidly coalescing into a colonial nouveau riche class distinct from the traditional ruling chieftaincy. Notable amongst them were Alhaji Alhassan Dantata (a member of a hereditary Hausa sub-group whose traditional vocation was trade) and Sir Louis Odumegwu Ojukwu (a member of an Igbo trading family). In addition to traders, the rising colonial class also counted British-educated doctors, lawyers, clergymen and civil servants among its members. Some of these people (such as Sir Louis) - as well as select chiefs - were knighted by the colonists.

Many members of both the chieftaincy and the free class were also assimilated at this time into this new bourgeoisie after themselves being educated along Western lines. As a result, a new dichotomy was created - between all those that had been so educated and the mass of Nigerians that had not. Bourgeois individuals such as the Saro, the Amaro, and the educated natives were paternalistically supported by the British (particularly prior to 1900), even while the chiefs were utilized by them as partners in the indirect rule system that administered the country. The symbiotic interplay of both groups of Nigerians gave rise to what is today Nigeria's political elite.

=== Independent Nigeria ===
At Independence in 1960, members of what was by then the Nigerian upper middle class were represented amongst the new leadership that inherited power. For example, Chief Funmilayo Ransome-Kuti (the daughter of a Saro chief that had once traded palm produce) was a member of the Western Region's House of Chiefs.

In the decades since, the class system has expanded further. The middle class' links to the political elite have been strengthened, and advantageous policy changes on the part of the politicians have led to the generation of large amounts of wealth. Notable contemporary members of the Nigerian bourgeoisie include billionaires Chief Mike Adenuga (a member of a Yoruba sub-tribe with a reputation for being keen traders), Chief Folorunsho Alakija (a member of a family of traders that married into a prominent Amaro clan), and Alhaji Aliko Dangote (a direct descendant of Alhaji Dantata and the richest Black man in the world).

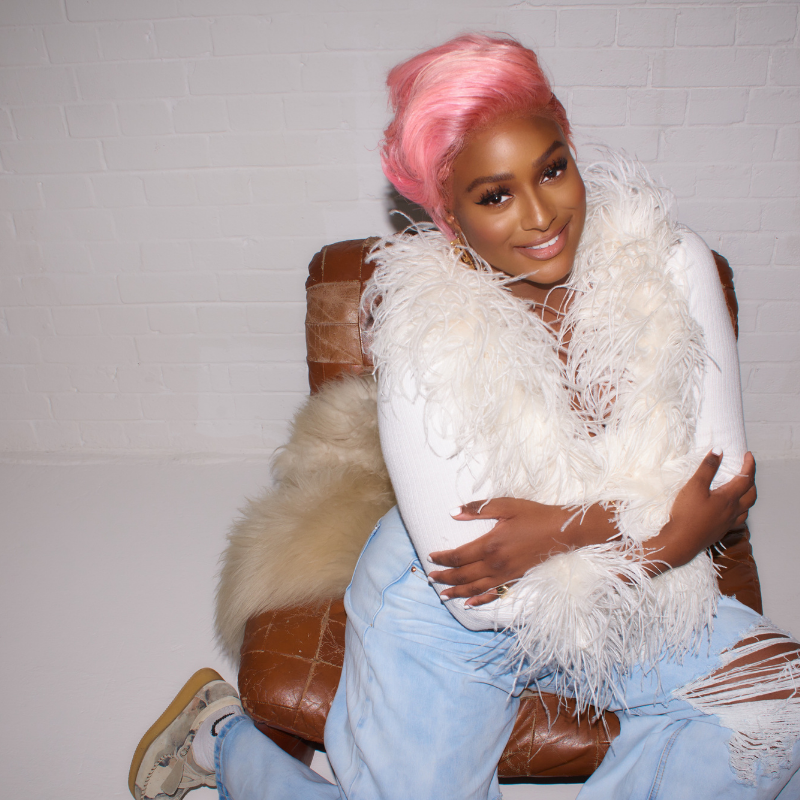
The musician DJ Cuppy is the daughter of billionaire Femi Otedola and granddaughter of Sir Michael Otedola, a governor of Lagos.

Many members of the current proletariat have historic ties of descent to either the chieftaincy or the bourgeoisie, and therefore belong to families that can be said to have lost caste in the intervening decades due to a variety of factors. Although upward social mobility has become more prevalent in independent Nigeria in theory, corruption, nepotism and cronyism have kept many people out of the upper and middle classes in a continuous cycle of deprivation despite the growth in the country's national wealth.

== Criticism ==
=== Conspicuous consumption amongst the ruling classes ===
Much like the ruling classes of other countries, the Nigerian upper and middle strata have continued to live in a way that most Nigerians can only imagine; their members have thrown lavish wedding parties, imported their food from abroad, visited or lived in global hotspots for extended periods, owned homes in areas of Nigeria that are amongst the most expensive in the world, and often used their helicopters instead where others are forced to endure traffic for hours. This has led to a significant amount of criticism over the years, most famously that which was offered by the aforementioned Chief Ransome-Kuti, herself a committed socialist. She once wrote:

... The true position of Nigerian women had to be judged by the women who carried babies on their backs and farmed from sunrise to sunset... Not women who used tea, sugar, and flour for breakfast.

== See also ==
- Culture of Nigeria
