= Paul Levy (journalist) =

American-British journalist

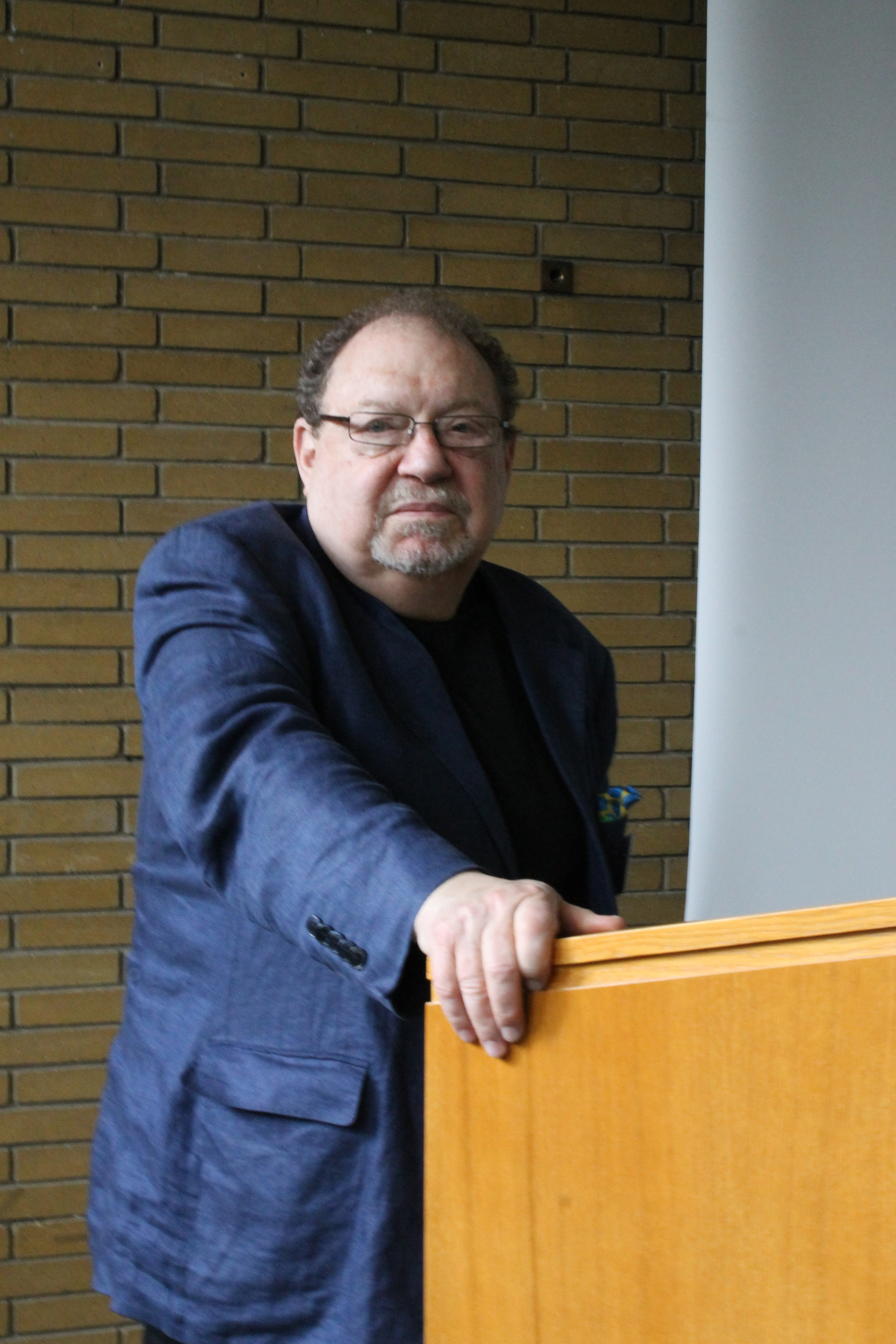
Paul Levy at the Oxford Symposium on Food and Cookery, 2012

Paul Levy (born 26 February 1941 in Lexington, Kentucky) is a US/British author and journalist. He lives with his wife, art historian, Penelope Marcus, in Oxfordshire UK. He was elected a Fellow of the Royal Society of Literature in 1980.

He and Ann Barr, in an article in Harpers & Queen in 1982, were the first in Britain to use the word "foodie"—whether they coined the word is not clear because Gael Greene used it at almost the same moment in New York Magazine. He has won many British and American food writing and journalism prizes, including two commendations in the British Press Awards, in 1985 and 1987. He is the author of the standard work on the philosopher G. E. Moore and the Cambridge Apostles and the editor of several volumes of Lytton Strachey's writings including The Letters of Lytton Strachey.

== Education ==
Levy attended Lafayette High School, Lexington; University of Chicago; University College London; Harvard (Ph.D.); Nuffield College, Oxford. His Harvard dissertation on G. E. Moore, completed in 1979, was published in the same year.

== Work experience ==
Levy wrote on food for Harpers & Queen. From 1980 he was food editor, and from 1982 food and wine editor, on The Observer. He was subsequently arts correspondent for The Wall Street Journal, where he reported to Raymond Sokolov, and Wall Street Journal Europe. He blogs on culture at ArtsJournal.com/plainenglish, contributes obituaries to the Independent, Guardian and Telegraph, and has written many entries for The Oxford Dictionary of National Biography. He is co-literary executor of Lytton Strachey's estate, trustee of the Strachey Trust, and Chair Emeritus of the Oxford Symposium on Food and Cookery.

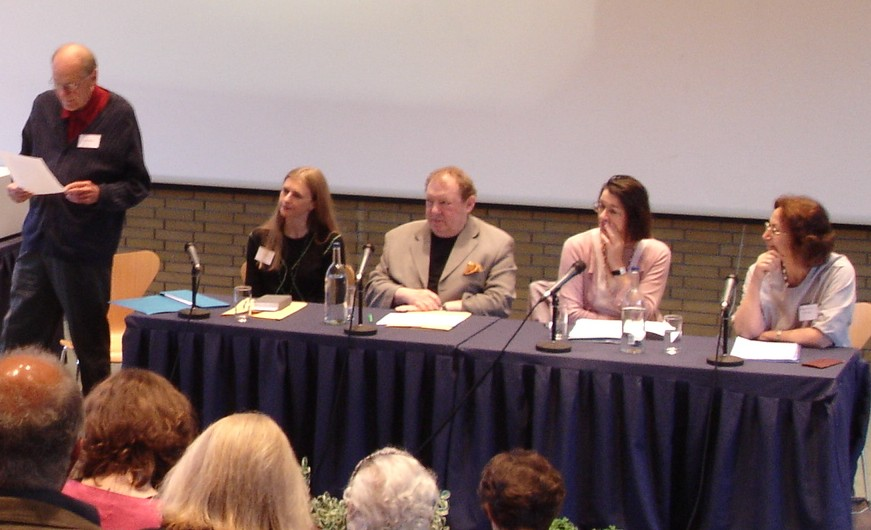
Harlan Walker (standing), Paul Levy (centre) and Claudia Roden (right) among panellists at the Oxford Symposium, 2006

== Publications ==
- (ed.) Lytton Strachey: The Really Interesting Question and other papers, 1972
- Moore: G.E. Moore and the Cambridge Apostles, 1979
- (co-ed. with Michael Holroyd) The Shorter Strachey, 1980
- (co-author with Ann Barr) The Official Foodie Handbook, 1984
- Out to Lunch, 1986
- Finger-Lickin' Good: A Kentucky childhood, 1990
- The Feast of Christmas, 1992. Writer and presenter of 5-part Channel Four network/ABC (Australia)/CBC (Canada) TV series with same title
- (ed.) The Penguin Book of Food and Drink, 1996
- (ed.) Eminent Victorians, The Definitive Edition, 2002
- (ed.) The Letters of Lytton Strachey, 2005
