= Peter York =

British management consultant

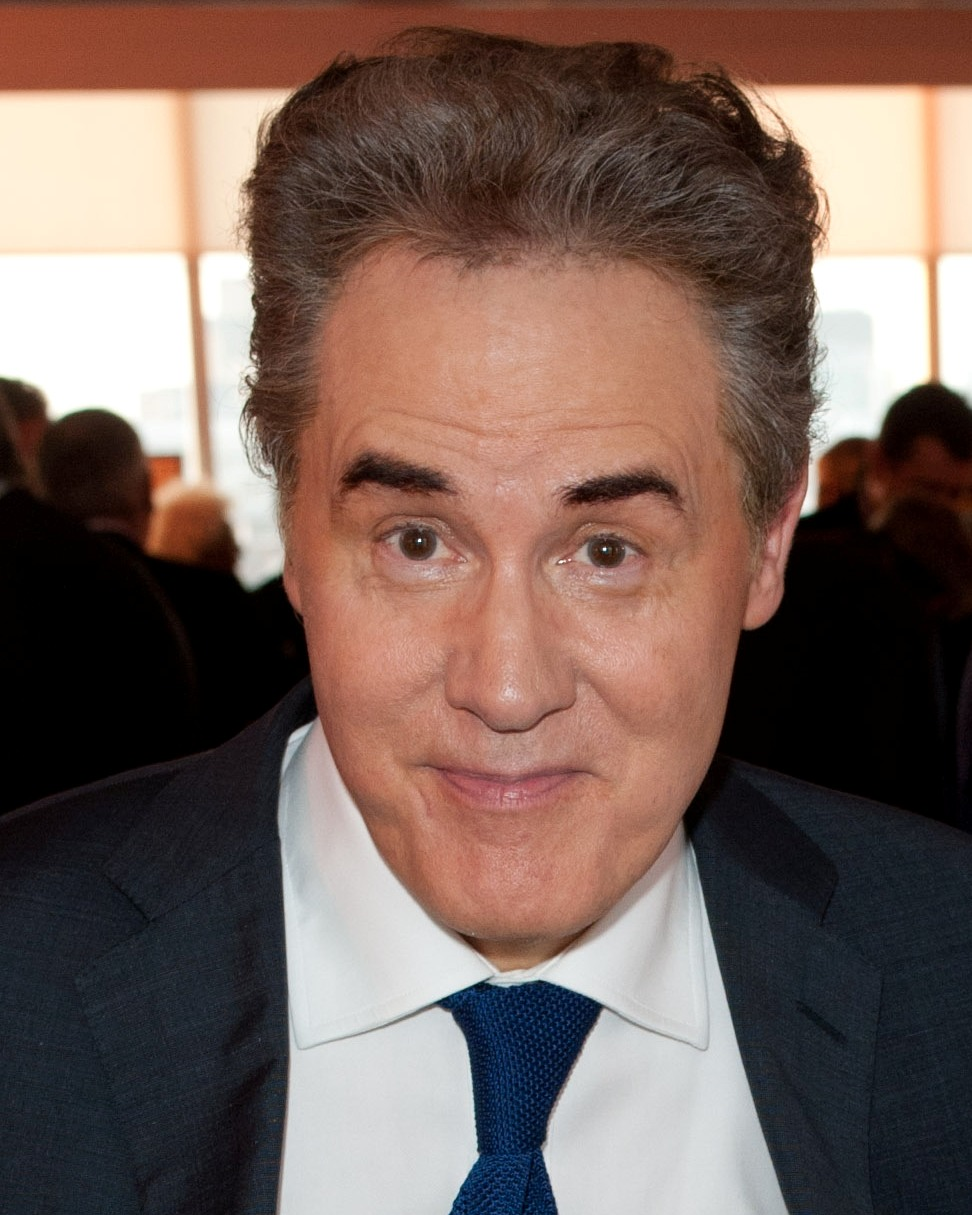
York in 2013

Peter York (born Peter Wallis; 1944) is a British management consultant, author and broadcaster best known for writing Harpers & Queen's The Official Sloane Ranger Handbook with Ann Barr. He has worked as a columnist for The Independent on Sunday, GQ and Management Today, and Associate of the media, analysis and networking organisation Editorial Intelligence.

Wallis was the co-founder with Lord Stevenson of the management consultancy SRU Ltd, and during the 1980s developed the SRU Group of nine specialist business consultancies. He was appointed Chairman of a Department of Trade and Industry Committee in March 1994. The committee was set up to examine the future of leisure in the UK as part of the British Government's 'Foresight' initiative.

SRU was sold to Brunswick Group in 2000. The relationship foundered, and SRU was bought back into private ownership. It remains private.

As Peter York, Wallis has made his most high-profile offerings, from writing the Sloane Ranger Handbook and being Style Editor of Harpers & Queen for 10 years, to financing The Modern Review.

He published a series of essays in social and cultural observation in the magazine Harpers & Queen during the late 1970s. Written in the style of Tom Wolfe's new journalism, these were collected in the book Style Wars (1980). Following the success of his collaboration with Ann Barr, The Official Sloane Ranger Handbook (1982), itself an extension of such social observation, he became a media commentator on English social trends and traits. A further collection of essays, Modern Times, was published in 1984. Peter York's Eighties (1996), this time co-authored with Charles Jennings, was both a book and a BBC television series.

Dictators' Homes (2005), published in the US under the title Dictator Style: Lifestyles of the World's Most Colorful Despots, explored the interior design favoured by dictators as a reflection of their despotic characters.

In 2015, York presented a sixty-minute live show, How to Become a Nicer Type of Person, on stage in Edinburgh and London. In November 2016 he presented Peter York's Hipster Handbook on BBC Four.

== Books ==
- Style Wars (1980)
- The Official Sloane Ranger Handbook (1982), co-authored with Ann Barr
- Peter York's Eighties (1996), co-authored with Charles Jennings
- Dictators' Homes (2005)
- Cooler, Faster, More Expensive: the Return of the Sloane Ranger (2007), with Olivia Stewart-Liberty.
- Authenticity is a Con (2014)
