= Foodie =

Person who has an ardent or refined interest in food and alcoholic beverages

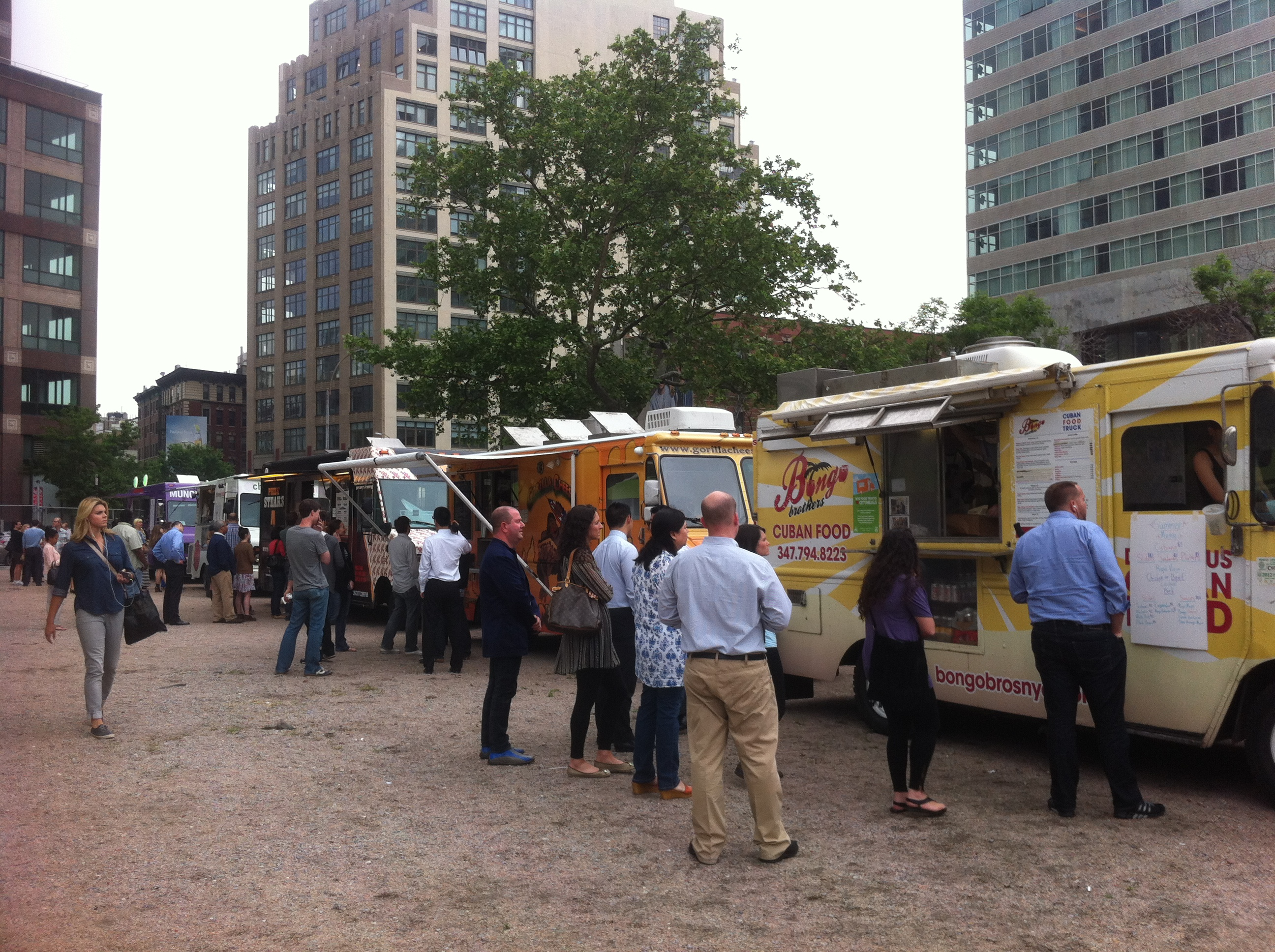
Food truck rallies may draw foodies, who congregate to sample the goods.

A foodie is a person who has an ardent or refined interest in food, and who eats food not only out of hunger but also as a hobby. The related terms "gastronome" and "gourmet" define roughly the same thing, i.e. a person who enjoys food for pleasure; the connotation of "foodie" differs slightly—an everyday person with a love for food culture and different foods. Some, such as Paul Levy, say the foodie can still be a "foodist". Foodie in slang can be used to describe someone who searches out food and bases their schedule around that endeavor.

== Usage ==
The word foodie — not as elitist as a gourmet, more discriminating than a glutton — was first named in print in the early 1980s. The term came into use almost simultaneously in the United States and Britain. Gael Greene is sometimes credited as being the first to use the word; in June 1980, she wrote in New York Magazine of a character who "slips into the small Art Deco dining room of Restaurant d'Olympe ... to graze cheeks with her devotees, serious foodies." Immediately afterwards, foodie was defined in the British press. Ann Barr, features editor of the London magazine Harper's & Queen, had asked readers to comment on a then-new obsession with food.

Several readers' responses named Paul Levy, food writer in Harper's & Queen, as the perfect example. Levy played along, contributing an anonymous article in August 1982, defining the term as "foodist", who "dislike and despise all non-foodies" and characterizing himself as the "ghastly, his-stomach-is-bigger-than-his-eyes, original, appetite-unsuppressed, lip-smacking 'king foodie'". The word gained currency rapidly, partly because Barr and Levy followed up with a book, The Official Foodie Handbook (ISBN 0 85223 348 5), published in 1984.

== Receptions of the term ==
Chris Onstad, author of the webcomic Achewood and the author of The Achewood Cookbook, stated a dislike for the term. Onstad said "There are so many words that already describe the concept of people who like food, or enjoy cooking, or enjoy knowing about cooking. "Foodie": It's like the infantile diminutive—you put a "y" on the end of everything to make it childlike. We don't need it. It's embarrassing. 'Girl, I'm a foodie.' Like oh my God."

Many journalists, like Roberto A. Ferdman, author of "Stop Calling Yourself a 'Foodie'" in the Washington Post, also criticize the word saying, "There is a great irony in describing yourself as a food insider in a way no actual food insider ever would." Ferdman claims that people who associate themselves with being a "foodie" are in fact distancing themselves from the group they wish to be associated with. The author then states that there is nothing wrong with having an interest in food, in fact this popular trend is helping the food movement thrive. Ferdman's main argument is that since the word is so widely used, its meaning has become ubiquitous and some meaning is lost upon the need to constantly announce how much someone likes to eat.

== Pursuits ==
Foodies are a distinct hobbyist group. Typical foodie interests and activities include the food industry, wineries and wine tasting, breweries and beer sampling, food science, cooking, following restaurant openings and closings and occasionally reopenings, food distribution, food fads, health and nutrition, cooking classes, culinary tourism, and restaurant management. A foodie might develop a particular interest in a specific item, such as the best egg cream or burrito. Many publications have food columns that cater to foodies and many of the websites carrying the name foodie have become popular amongst the foodies. Interest by foodies in the 1980s and 1990s gave rise to the Food Network and other specialized food programming, popular films and television shows about food such as Top Chef and Iron Chef, a renaissance in specialized cookbooks, specialized periodicals such as Gourmet Magazine and Cook's Illustrated, growing popularity of farmers' markets, food-oriented websites like Zagat's and Yelp, publishing and reading food blogs like Foodbeast and foodieworld, specialized kitchenware stores like Williams Sonoma and Sur La Table, and the institution of the celebrity chef.

Foodies have a significant social media presence; food lovers have created their own YouTube channels where they show what they cook and where they eat around the world. It has also become a common practice to take photos of food and beverages consumed at home or outside and share them on Facebook, Twitter, Instagram, or other media in a form of food porn.

== See also ==
- Culinary tourism
- Fooding
- Gourmand
