= Linda Bean =

American businessperson and donor (1941–2024)

- Born: Linda Lorraine Bean; April 28, 1941; Portland, Maine, U.S.
- Died: March 23, 2024 (aged 82); Maine, U.S.
- Education: Alaska Methodist University (1965–1966); Antioch College (1963)
- Occupations: Businesswoman; political candidate
- Known for: Restaurateur
- Spouses: James Raymond Clark (m. 1963, unk); Verne E. Jones (m. 1975; died 1985); Donald L. Folkers (m. 1990; unk 2007)
- Relatives: Leon Leonwood Bean, founder of L.L.Bean (grandfather)

Linda Lorraine Bean (April 28, 1941 – March 23, 2024) was an American businessperson and donor. As a candidate of the Republican Party, Bean ran unsuccessfully for the United States Congress in 1988 and 1992. She was the granddaughter of Leon Leonwood Bean and an heiress to the L.L.Bean company.

== Early life ==
Bean was born in Portland, Maine on April 28, 1941. She was the granddaughter of Leon Leonwood Bean, the founder of the Maine retailer of outdoor goods, L.L. Bean, which became one of Maine's largest employers. Her father, Charles Bean, designed leather and canvas goods for his father's company. Her mother, Hazel June (Turner) Bean, met Charles while working in the typing pool at the company, and later became a member of the L.L. Bean board.

Linda Bean earned a degree in business and accounting at Antioch College, graduating in 1963. She married her first husband, James Raymond Clark, that year. Her second marriage, to Verne E. Jones in 1975, ended when he died in 1985. She was married to her third husband, Donald L. Folkers, from 1990 to 2007.

== Business interests ==
In 2007, Bean bought a wharf in Port Clyde for the purpose of starting her own lobster business. She later purchased others in Tenants Harbor and on the island of Vinalhaven. Her business eventually produced over nine million pounds of lobster annually. In 2016, Bean partially retired and turned over majority ownership of her lobster enterprises to her general manager and employees in an employee stock ownership plan (ESOP). With John Hathaway, in whose Shucks Maine Lobster she also invested, Bean took the lead in achieving sustainability certification for the entire Maine coast trap lobster fishery by meeting the standards of the Marine Stewardship Council as announced by its founder Rupert Howes and by Maine Governor Paul LePage on March 10, 2013, at the International Boston Seafood Show.

Bean's investment in the lobster industry was controversial. She argued for more lobster processing in Maine rather than in Canada, where more than half of Maine's lobsters went for processing and sale by other companies to the U.S. and elsewhere. Additionally, an undercover video taken by PETA allegedly at one of the Maine Lobster processing plants showed workers ripping limbs off live lobsters, raising questions of animal cruelty. A lawyer for Bean told the Portland Press Herald that "Our practices do not violate Maine's laws on cruelty to animals because lobsters do not come within the covered definition."

In addition to the lobster industry, Bean's interests included the timber and hospitality industries. She owned large tracts of timber in western Maine, including maple syrup producing sugarbushes in Weld and Wyman. The restaurants which she owned featured her grandfather's camp recipes and her own lobster roll. The Portland International Jetport features a Linda Bean's Maine Lobster Cafe with a full lounge bar. Her largest Maine restaurant was Linda Bean's Maine Kitchen & Topside Tavern located across from the L.L.Bean flagship store in Freeport, Maine, the original site of a tavern built there in 1790. On September 27, 2010, Bean purchased the original tavern location from a retired fellow Freeport native George Denney.

In April 2018, Bean opened an antiques stores in Freeport adjoining her grandfather's former home under the name Freeport Antiques & Heirlooms Showcase. Some of her businesses in Port Clyde, which included the Port Clyde General Store and an art gallery, were destroyed by a fire in September 2023 and were not yet rebuilt at the time of her death in March 2024. Three original paintings by Jamie Wyeth – "Snapper", "Red tailed Hawk", "With Green Pepper", and one original N.C. Wyeth artwork which Bean had acquired – were destroyed in the fire. In late 2024, 24 artworks from Bean's estate were sold for $2.5 million by Bonhams. The collection included 20 by members of the Wyeth family, such as N.C. Wyeth’s “Unknown (Coastal Scene with Apple Tree in Foreground),” which went for $950,000, “Self Portrait in Top Hat,” which sold for $400,000, Andrew Wyeth’s “The Gam,” which sold for $160,000, and Jamie Wyeth’s “Dead Cat Museum, Monhegan Island,” which sold for $280,000.

== Philanthropy ==
Bean served on the boards of numerous philanthropic organizations. These include the Brandywine Conservancy and Museum of Art in Chadds Ford, Pennsylvania, the Maine Historical Society, the Maine Chapter of The Nature Conservancy, the Portland Museum of Art and the Intercollegiate Studies Institute in Wilmington, Delaware.

In 2016 she was awarded the honorary degree of Doctor of Humane Letters by The Kings College in Manhattan.

In 2019 she founded The N.C.Wyeth Research Foundation and Reading Libraries, a non-profit private operating foundation established in Massachusetts to restore the illustrator's homes in Needham, and Wilmington, Delaware, and create a library and programs in Port Clyde, Maine, to foster a documented study of his leading contribution to the American age of book, magazine, calendar and poster illustration.

In January 2020, Linda Bean was one of thirteen "Women of Vision" honorees announced by the Farnsworth Art Museum. This was met with a published letter of objection in a local newspaper due to her political activities (see below).

== Political activities ==
=== Publisher of The Maine Paper ===
Bean served as publisher of The Maine Paper, a conservative newspaper published from 1979 to 1982.

=== Congressional campaigns ===
Bean ran twice for Congress, in 1988 and 1992. In 1988, Bean sought the Republican nomination for Maine's 1st district of the House to challenge incumbent former Maine Governor Joseph Brennan. She ran under her married name of Linda Bean Jones. She outspent her opponent, Edward S. O'Meara, by $395,000 but narrowly lost.

Bean ran again in 1992 for the Republican nomination, this time successfully, to challenge incumbent Democrat Thomas Andrews. She won the nomination but lost 65% to 35% in the general election.

=== Stances on women's and LGBTQ rights ===
Linda Bean served as the vice chairman of the conservative group Eagle Forum Education and Legal Defense Fund for many years. In 2005, Bean gave $10,000 to the Maine Grassroots Coalition, whose goal was to repeal a Maine law making discrimination based on sexual orientation illegal in employment, housing, credit, public accommodations, and education. Bean was also a fundraiser for the ERA Impact Coalition in Maine, which overturned the passage of the statewide Equal Rights Amendment in Maine in 1984. In 2017, Bean, as part of The Conservative Action project, signed a Memo for the Movement called "Restoring America's Military Strength: Military Readiness or Transgender Politics" calling on the U.S. Defense Department to "rescind Defense Department and military service directives permitting transgender individuals to serve" and for the Trump Administration to "discontinue funding and directing personnel resources for special-interest events, including LGBT-Pride Month events in June."

=== Longtime Conservative Activism ===
In 1985, Linda Bean (then known as Linda Jones) accompanied Phyllis Schlafly and other American women's organizations to the Geneva Summit meeting to support President Ronald Reagan on intercontinental ballistic missile defense issues discussed with Russian leader Mikhail Gorbachev (Strategic Defense Initiative).

In 2016, the Southern Poverty Law Center, a legal advocacy organization specializing in civil rights and public interest litigation, stated that Linda Bean was a member of the then-35-year-old "shadowy and intensely secretive group" the Council for National Policy; stating what is "most remarkable about the directory is that it reveals how the CNP has become a key meeting place where ostensibly mainstream conservatives interact with individuals who are, by any reasonable definition, genuinely extremist." She was a longtime member, having been invited to join the Council for National Policy established by Reagan's Attorney General Edwin Meese after the Reagan years.

=== Donations ===
In 2016, Bean donated $25,000 to Making Maine Great Again PAC, a group supporting then-candidate Donald Trump's presidential campaign. Her donation led to calls for her to be removed from the board of L.L. Bean, though Bean herself clarified the donation was her own and not the company's.

In April 2020, Bean gave $12,500 to the Club for Growth Action PAC, which is known for donating to conservative liberty politicians and organizations.

== Death ==
On March 23, 2024, Bean died at the age of 82. Her death was confirmed by her assistant and also the general manager of her Freeport restaurant, Linda Bean's Maine Kitchen.

== Electoral history ==
Maine's 1st congressional district election, 1992
Party	Candidate	Votes	%
Democratic	Thomas Andrews (inc.)	232,696	64.96%
Republican	Linda Bean	125,326	34.98%
	Write-ins	216	0.06%
Total votes		358,238	100.0
Democratic hold			
