= The White Horse, Fulham =

Pub in Fulham, London

Coordinates: 51°28′28″N 0°12′1″W

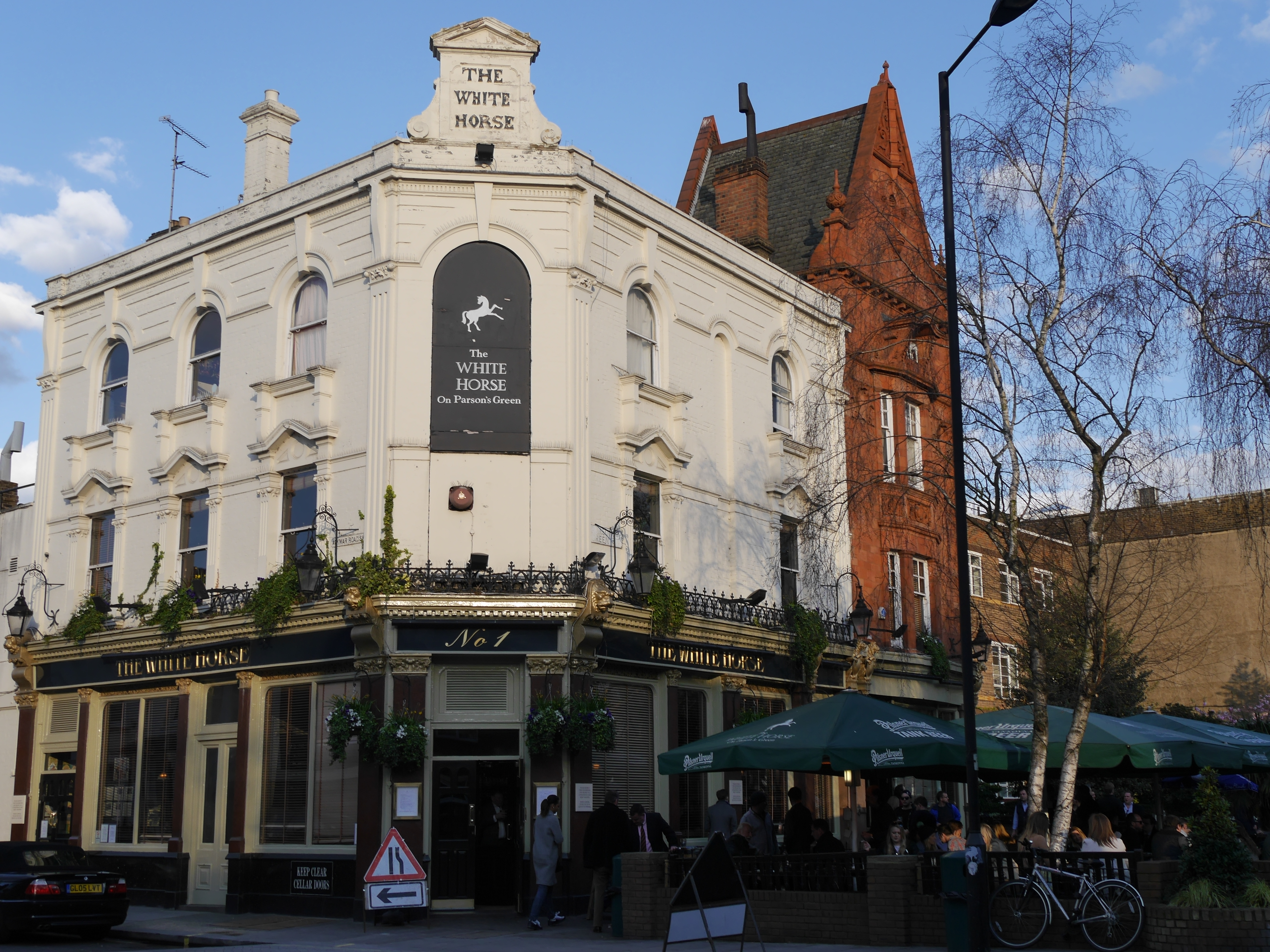
The White Horse, 2016

The White Horse is a pub in Parsons Green, Fulham, London, known colloquially by many as "The Sloaney Pony", a reference to the "Sloane Rangers" who frequent it. It is a popular and busy pub which is featured in many good guides. The pub has been voted in the past as one of London's best pubs, due to the wide selections of bottled and draft beer that they recommend to customers, as opposed to wine.

== History ==
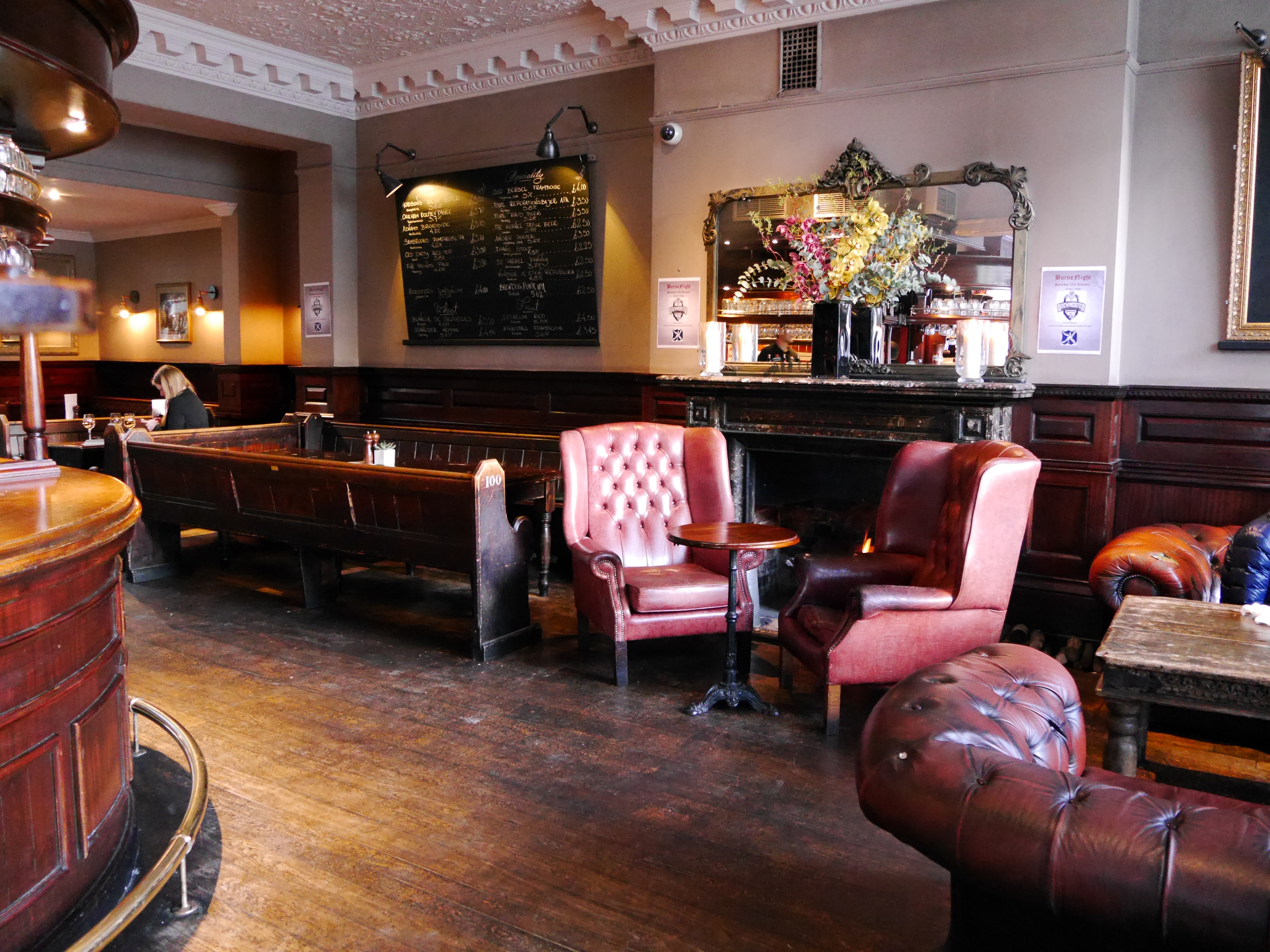
Interior view

The White Horse is an historic pub. A coaching inn has existed on the present site since at least 1688. The pub was first mentioned in The Spectator in August 1712 in relation to the popular annual Parson's Green Fair at which ale tapping was an eagerly awaited event.

The White Horse was also the meeting place of the old Fulham Albion Cricket Club, one of the pioneer cricket clubs in England.

The actual address is 1-3 Parsons Green, London SW6 4UL.
