= Food truck rally =

Event with a group of food trucks

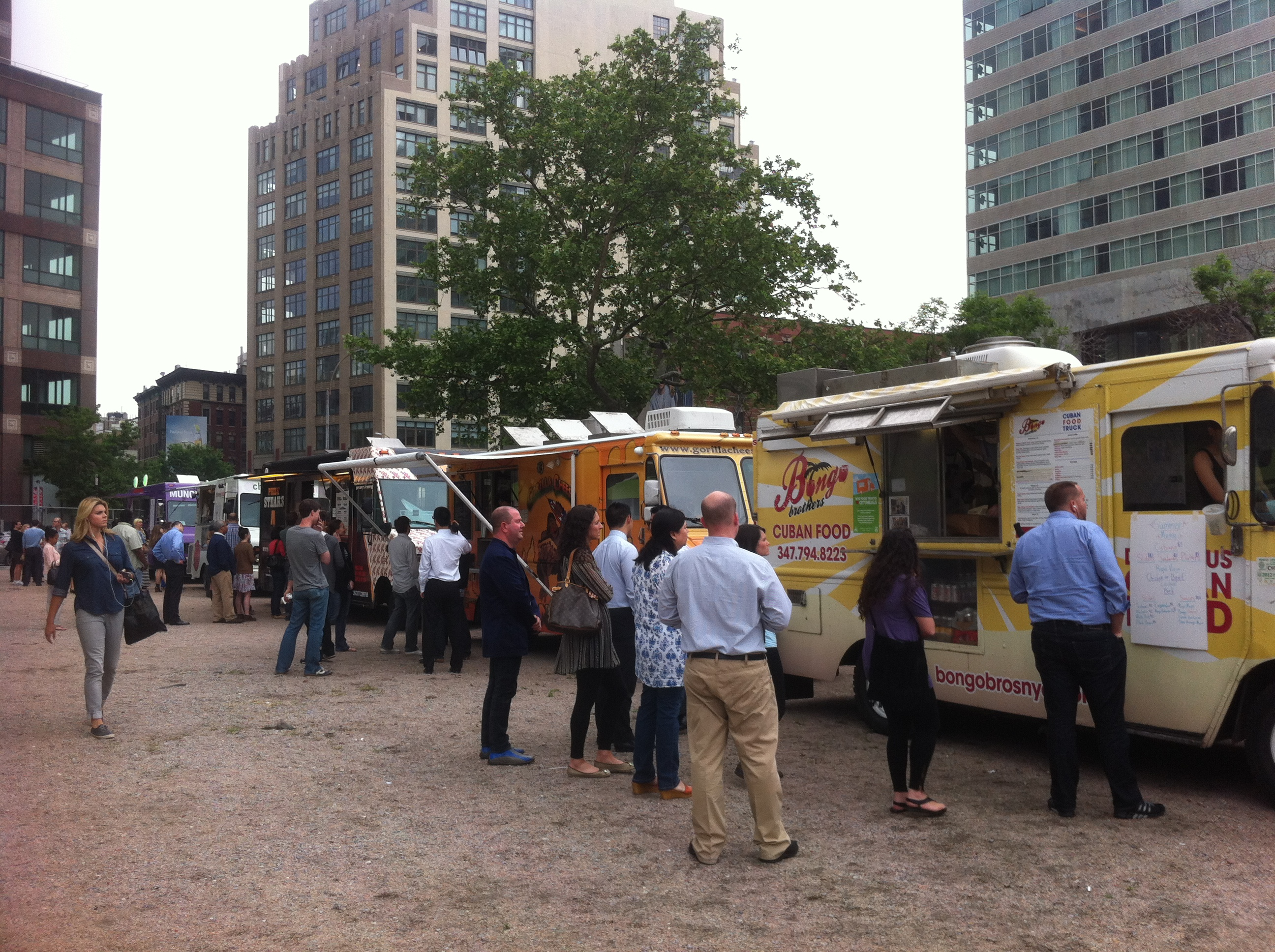
Food trucks gather at LentSpace in New York City in 2012

A food truck rally (also called a food truck festival, food truck rodeo, food truck gathering, or similar names) is an event where a group of food trucks gather in one location.

The events typically feature "modern" food trucks emphasizing food quality and variety, a trend which has grown significantly in popularity in the United States since approximately 2008. Formal gatherings of food trucks as an event in the United States began in 2010. The first LA Food Fest, held in February 2010, appears to have been one of the earliest such events.

Tampa, Florida, which has been a popular area for food trucks and hosted its first food truck event in September 2011, hosted a rally with 121 food trucks in March 2014, said to be a new world record, breaking the prior record of 99 set in Tampa in September 2013. Prior to that, an April 2013 "food truck parade" in Miami, with 62 trucks, was declared the largest to date. In 2018, Chicago Food Truck Festival planned to have over 50 food trucks in Chicago. Also, in 2018 more than 50 food trucks rallied in Meridian Township. Also, in 2018, in Muskeon Michigan a food truck rally of 23 food trucks occurred. In June 2018, over 30 food trucks rallied in Daytona. Furthermore, there are more food truck rallies occurring throughout the US.

== See also ==
- Food truck
- Foodie
