= L.L.Bean =

American retail company

L.L.Bean, Inc.

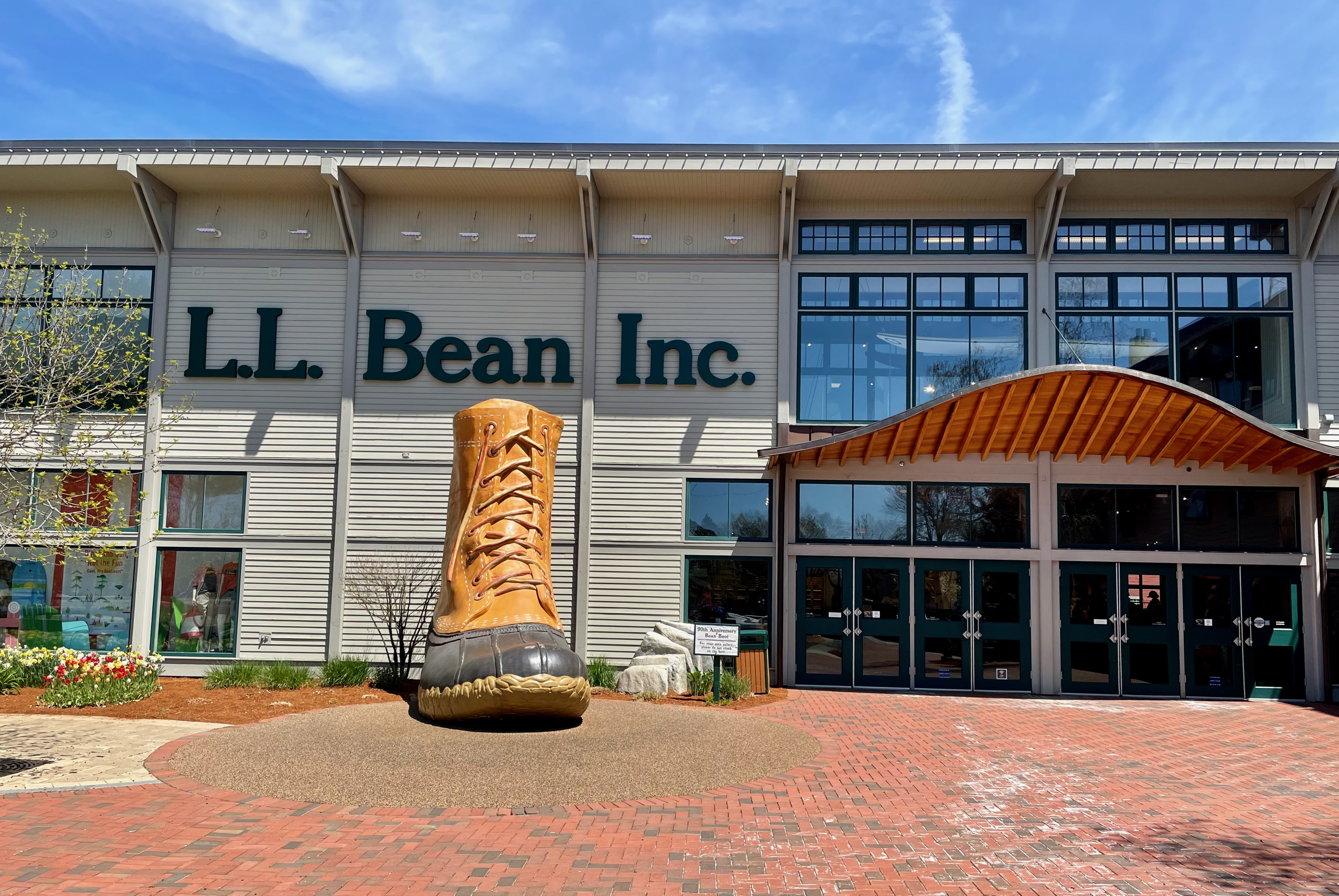
- L.L.Bean's flagship store and Bean Boot in Freeport, Maine
- Type: Privately held company
- Industry: Retail
- Founded: 1912 (114 years ago)
- Founder: Leon Leonwood Bean
- Headquarters: 15 Casco Street, Freeport, Maine, U.S. 43.850°N 70.109°W
- Number of locations: 54 stores
- Area served: Worldwide
- Key people: Shawn Gorman (Chairman); Greg Elder (President & CEO)
- Products: Clothing; Outdoor equipment; Home Goods
- Revenue: ▲US$1.7 billion (2023)
- Number of employees: 6,438 (2021)
- Website: www.llbean.com

L.L.Bean is an American privately held retail company that was founded in 1912 by Leon Leonwood Bean. The company, headquartered in Freeport, Maine (where it was founded), specializes in clothing and outdoor recreation equipment. L.L.Bean sells a variety of hiking, weather, and other utility products.

== History ==
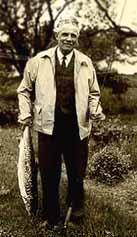
Company founder Leon Leonwood Bean (1872–1967)

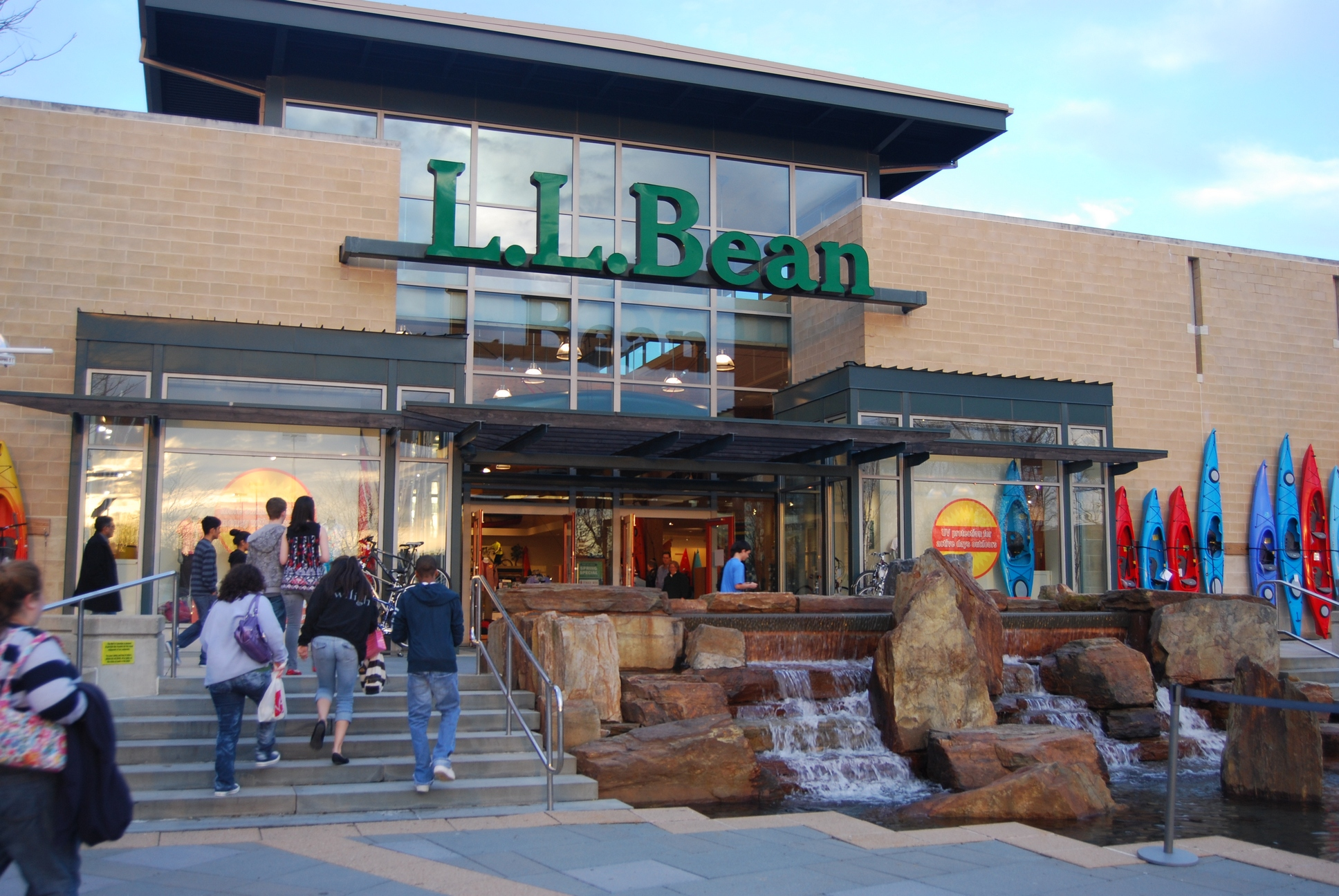
A former L.L.Bean store at The Mall in Columbia, c. 2009

L.L.Bean was founded in 1912 by its namesake, hunter and fisherman Leon Leonwood Bean, in Freeport, Maine. The company began as a one-room operation selling a single product, the Maine Hunting Shoe, also known as duck boots and later as Bean Boots. Bean had developed a waterproof boot, which is a combination of lightweight leather uppers and rubber bottoms, that he sold to hunters. He obtained a list of nonresident Maine hunting license holders, prepared a descriptive mail order circular, set up a shop in his brother's basement in Freeport, and started a nationwide mail-order business. The company's first hunting boot was sewn by Gertrude Goldrup, whose sewing machine is on display in the flagship store.

By 1912, Bean was selling the Bean Boot through a four-page mail-order catalog, and the boot remains a staple of the company's outdoor image. Defects in the initial design led to 90 percent of the original production run being returned: Bean honored his money-back guarantee, corrected the design, and continued selling them.

In 1934, L.L. Bean was named President and Treasurer, Carl Bean was named Vice President and assistant treasurer, Jack Gorman (L.L. Bean's son-in-law) was named Vice President and clothing buyer, and Warren Bean was named clerk.

Gross sales for the company amounted to $1 million in 1946, increasing to $3.8 million in 1966, $20.4 million in 1974, and $237.4 million in 1984.

The 220,000 sq ft (20,000 m^{2}) L.L.Bean retail store campus in Freeport, Maine, is open 24 hours a day, 365 days a year.

As of February 26, 2024, L.L.Bean discontinued mail orders and shifted business entirely to online and telephone orders.

== Leadership ==
After Leon L. Bean's death in 1967, the company passed into the directorship of Bean's grandson, Leon Gorman, from that time until 2001, when Gorman decided to take the position of chairman. Christopher McCormick assumed the role of CEO, the first non-family member to assume the title. On May 19, 2013, Shawn Gorman, 47, a great-grandson of the company's founder, was elected L.L.Bean's chairman. The company announced a US$125,000 donation to a new scholarship fund upon Leon Gorman's death in 2015, representing about 2.5 years of tuition at Bowdoin College, Gorman's alma mater.

Stephen Smith was named chief executive officer (CEO) in November 2015, the first time in the company's 103-year history that a CEO had been hired from outside the company. In July 2025, the company announced that Smith would step down as CEO in Spring 2026. In January 2026, Greg Elder was named the new President and CEO. Elder first joined L.L.Bean in 2007. His previous roles with the company include vice president of stores, vice president of retail and chief retailer officer.

=== List of chairmen ===
1. Leon Gorman (2001–2013)
2. Shawn Gorman (since May 2013)

=== List of CEOs ===
1. Leon L. Bean (1912–1967)
2. Leon Gorman (1967–2001)
3. Christopher McCormick (2001–2015); first non-family CEO
4. Stephen Smith (2015–2026)
5. Greg Elder (since January 2026)

== Product line ==
The company sells a variety of hiking, weather, and other utility boots, along with other outdoor equipment such as firearms, backpacks, and tents, in addition to producing a full line of clothing and footwear. This includes a popular tote bag made of canvas.

L.L.Bean sources its products from the United States and across the globe. Most of the company's products are made outside of the U.S., with many made in China. L.L.Bean has factories in Jiangsu and Shandong, in addition to Cambodia. About 75 percent of L.L.Bean's products are made overseas.

As of 2016, its factory in Brunswick, Maine, employed more than 450 people who made the company's products by hand, such as the Maine Hunting Shoe, L.L.Bean Boot, Boat and Totes, dog beds, leather goods, and backpacks.

In 2000, L.L.Bean partnered with Japanese automaker Subaru, making L.L.Bean the official outfitter of Subaru, spawning the L.L.Bean edition Subaru Outback and Subaru Forester for the US market. The L.L.Bean trim levels were top-spec versions, with most available options included as standard equipment. This relationship with Subaru ended in June 2008. In 2010, L.L.Bean created a contemporary sub-brand called L.L.Bean Signature. The Signature line is a modern interpretation of L.L.Bean's previous products with modern fits.

== Retail stores ==
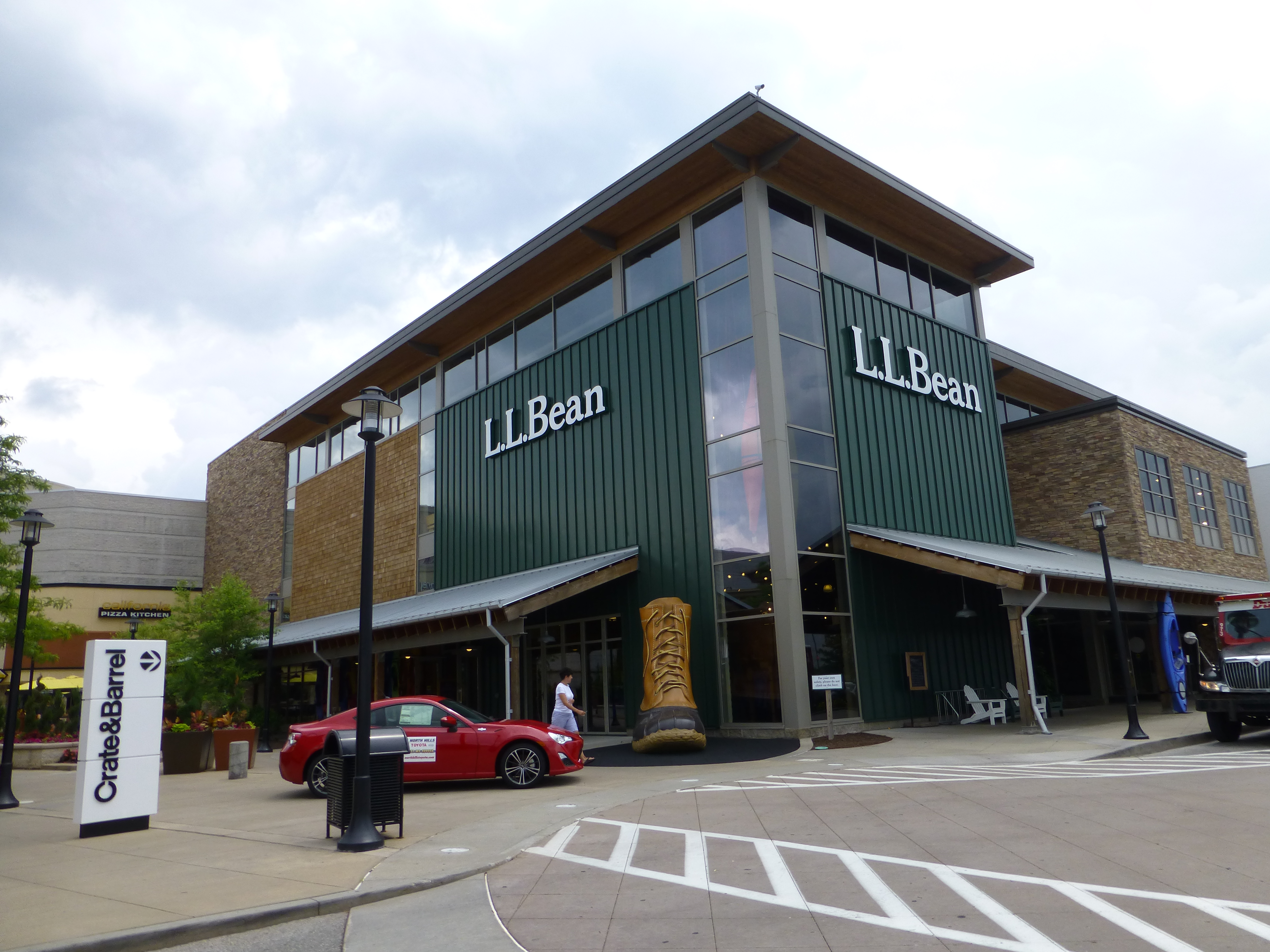
An L.L.Bean store at Ross Park Mall in Pittsburgh

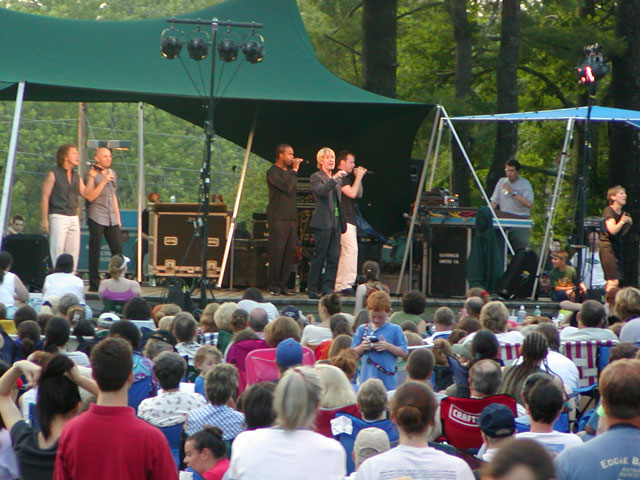
Rockapella performs at the L.L.Bean Summer Concert Series in July 2003

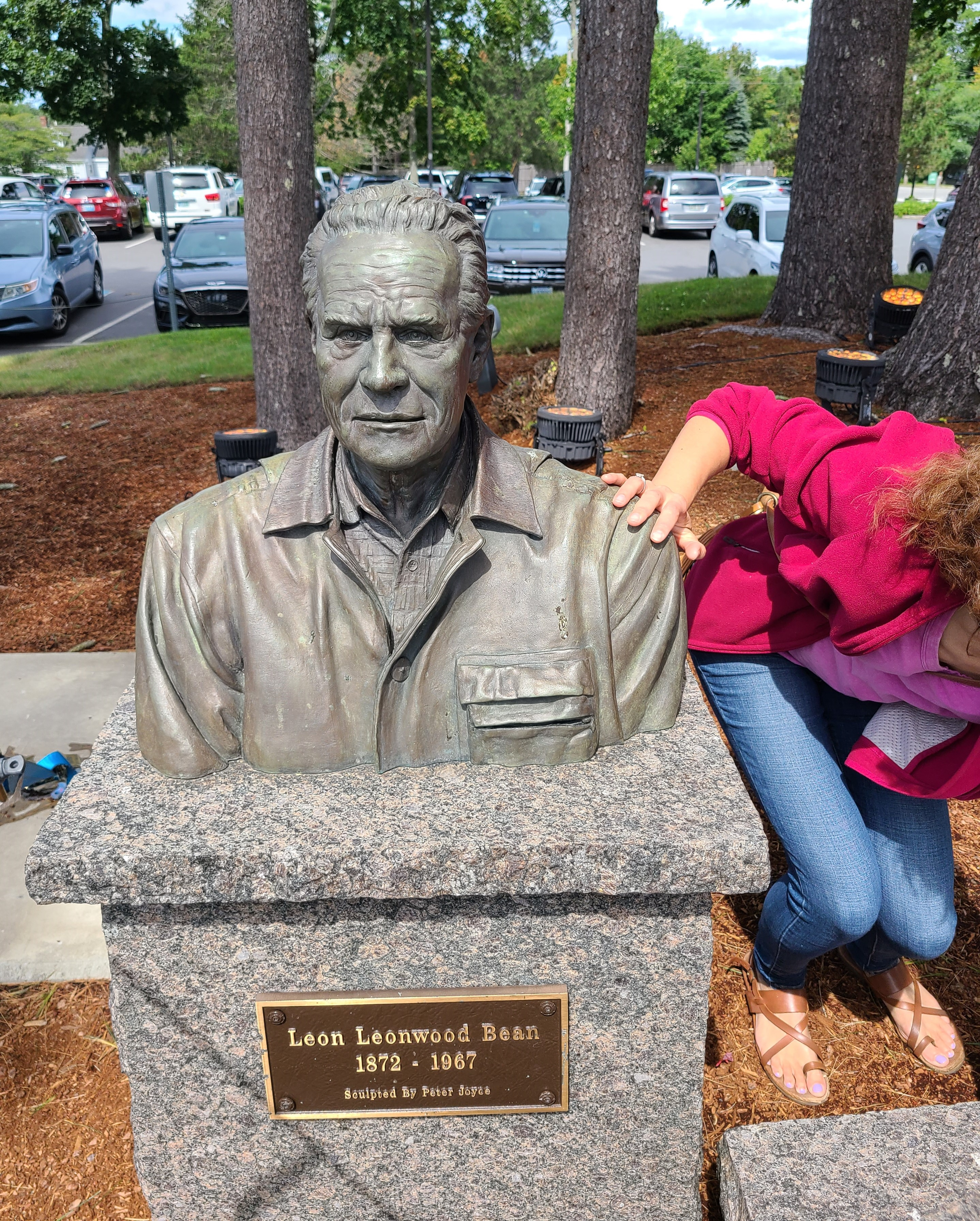
Bust of Leon Leonwood Bean outside flagship store

Along with a number of retail and outlet stores, the company maintains its flagship store on Main Street in Freeport. It attracts millions of visitors annually. This branch, originally opened in 1917, remained open continuously, 24 hours a day, between 1951 and 1962, when Maine changed its blue laws; a town vote later reinstated the store's open-door policy. The flagship has closed to honor the death of U.S. President John F. Kennedy in 1963, and the deaths of founder Leon L. Bean in 1967 and his grandson Leon Gorman in 2015. Due to the COVID-19 pandemic worldwide, all L.L.Bean stores were closed indefinitely starting on March 17, 2020, at midnight. It was the first time it had ever closed for more than 24 hours. The company began to reopen stores in May 2020.

L.L.Bean has invested heavily in activities for both visitors and residents in Freeport, including its Outdoor Discovery Schools, Christmas light displays, and its Summer Concert Series, which has attracted artists such as Grace Potter, Lake Street Dive, Edwin McCain, Great Big Sea, Buckwheat Zydeco, and Rockapella.

L.L.Bean opened its first outlet store in North Conway, New Hampshire, in 1988. As of 2024, the company has 60 locations in 19 U.S. states, plus 22 stores in Japan and 13 stores in Canada. The brand is also distributed in about 200 partner stores, such as Nordstrom.

In March 2018, L.L.Bean opened its first urban location in Boston's Seaport District. The 8,600-square-foot (800 m^{2}) store will be the model for further expansion in urban areas and carry a selection of merchandise selected to fit the surrounding community.

In November 2019, it was announced that L.L.Bean would be launching in the UK.

In February 2025, portions of the L.L.Bean flagship store were torn down in preparation for $50 million in renovations, which were completed in September 2026. The renovation took five years of planning and two years of active construction.

=== Returns policy ===
From its founding, L.L.Bean had an unlimited return policy, which allowed customers to return items with which they were dissatisfied at any time, even without a purchase receipt. On February 9, 2018, the company announced it would be limiting returns to within one year of purchase, and only with a receipt or other proof of purchase. L.L.Bean said that some customers had been abusing the policy by returning items that had been purchased from yard sales and third parties or used the policy as a lifetime replacement program for items with normal wear and tear. L.L.Bean has also stated it reserves the right to deny returns to those who regularly return items.

=== International expansion ===
L.L.Bean has ventured into international markets notably Japan and Canada, starting with Japan in 1976 with L.L.Bean bags debuting at American Life Shop BEAMS in Tokyo's Harajuku district in 1976. It opened its first outlet in Japan in November 1992 and expanded to 28 stores in the country by November 2018. The company then ventured into the Canadian market, launching an e-commerce site in 2018 under licensing by Toronto-based Jaytex Group and expansion directed under Brokerage Oberfeld Snowcap, and opening its first outlet in 2019 in Oakville, Ontario, with at least eight stores opened by the end of 2021 with plans to establish at least 20 more.

In 2020, the company expanded its outlets in Ontario, including one at Ottawa's Train Yards, one at the Georgian Mall in Barrie, and one at Vaughan Mills.

In 2021, the company opened outlets at Toronto's Shops at Don Mills, one at Halifax, Nova Scotia's Dartmouth Crossing, one at Calgary, Alberta's Deerfoot Meadows retail centre with two in British Columbia; one in Victoria's Mayfair Mall and one at Burnaby's The Amazing Brentwood. In 2022, there were five more Ontario openings; with one at Kitchener's The Boardwalk, Kingston's Cataraqui Mall, and one at Moncton, New Brunswick's Champlain Place, Niagara Falls' Canada One and Edmonton, Alberta's West Edmonton Mall.

== Political controversy ==
In January 2017, a group of political activists called for a boycott against the company after it was disclosed that Linda Bean, one of the descendants of founder Leon Leonwood Bean who sits on the board of directors, had donated US$60,000 to a political action committee that supported Donald Trump's 2016 presidential campaign. There were assertions that the contribution may be illegal. Trump posted on Twitter, in support of Linda Bean after calls for the boycott, "Thank you to Linda Bean of L.L.Bean for your great support and courage. People will support you even more now. Buy L.L.Bean." The company said it had not donated to Trump, nor have any of the other directors or any of the 50 other Bean heirs. It was unclear if the publicity hurt business, since sales were flat prior and for a second consecutive year in 2016.

The company distanced itself from Linda Bean and her comments in the time that followed, with Executive Chairman Shawn Gorman releasing a statement on the company's Facebook page, emphasizing that 'no individual alone speaks on behalf of the business or represents the values of the company'.

== Outdoor Discovery Schools ==
L.L.Bean has education programs connected to many of its retail outlets to support the outdoor interests of its customers. Customers can sign up to participate in a number of outdoor activities; all equipment and instruction are provided. Activities include archery, clay shooting, fly casting, and sea kayaking. More advanced classes are conducted as well, and must be reserved in advance. Snowshoeing and cross country skiing are available December to March. All other retail stores offer fly casting, kayaking and stand-up paddleboarding.

== In popular culture ==
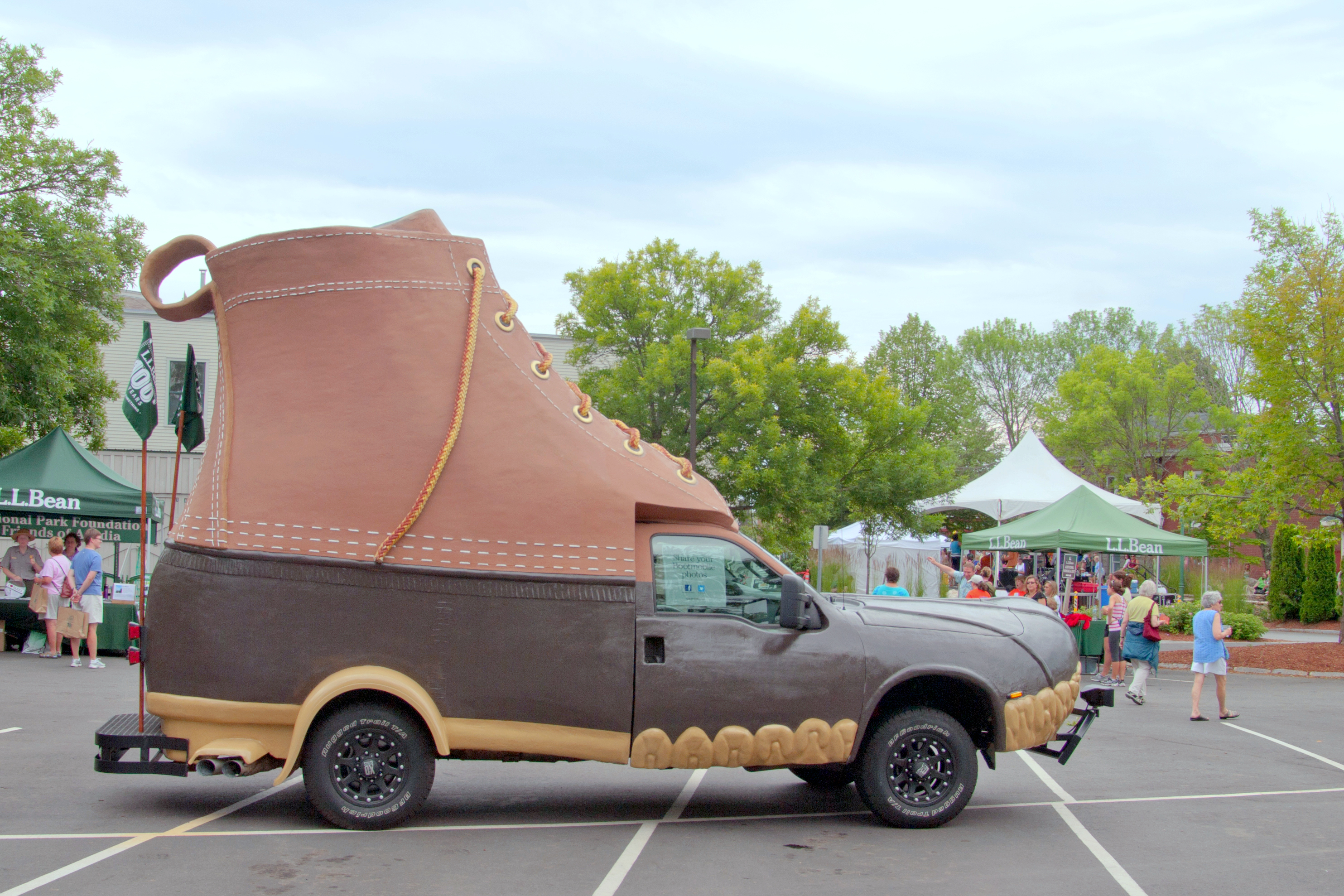
An L.L.Bean Bootmobile in Freeport, Maine, in July 2012

- Netflix Show Luke Cage refers to the company's return policy in Season 1, Episode 3. The character Cornell "Cottonmouth" Stokes (Mahershala Ali) is quoted saying "There ain't no return policy, this ain't L.L.Bean."
- Netflix Show Unbreakable Kimmy Schmidt character Jacqueline Voorhees (Jane Krakowski) jokes that the title character is "a model for L.L.Bean's performance fleeces" in Season 2 Episode 3.
- The Official Preppy Handbook, a description of upper-class and upper-middle-class life in America, describes L.L.Bean as "nothing less than Prep mecca."
- Author Hunter S. Thompson referred to wearing L.L.Bean shorts in a number of his works, most notably during the "Wave Speech" featured in chapter eight of Fear and Loathing in Las Vegas.
- The 1990 Paul Rudnick novel I'll Take It was a humorous tale of a Long Island mother taking some of her children on a fall shopping trip through New England, with L.L.Bean being the final destination. As the plot unfolds, the mother divulges to her son that she is actually planning to rob L.L.Bean in order to update her and her husband's furniture in their retirement.
- The blog Your LL Bean Boyfriend features the male models of the L.L.Bean Catalog paired with captions that the perfect boyfriend might say.
- In the 1988 film Beetlejuice, while looking around the horribly outdated house, the interior designer character Otho exclaims, "Ooo. Deliver me from L.L.Bean!"
- Alfred Gingold's Items from Our Catalog is a parody of the L.L.Bean catalog.
- In "Nothing to Fear" from the Muppet series Bear in the Big Blue House, Bear receives a skunk clock in the mail from the parody company "L.L. Bear."

== General and cited references ==
- Abelson, Jenn (September 1, 2006). "6 years later, L.L. Bean gets back in gear for expansion". The Boston Globe.
- "#259 LL Bean". The Largest Private Companies. Forbes. November 9, 2006.
- Gorman, Leon (2006). L.L.Bean: The Making of an American Icon. Harvard Business School Press. ISBN 1-57851-183-6.
- Montgomery, M.R. (1984). In Search of L.L.Bean. Little Brown. ISBN 0-316-57864-9.
  - Lehmann-Haupt, Christopher (16 November 1984). "In Search of L.L.Bean by M. R. Montgomery". The New York Times.
- Montgomery, M. R. (December 27, 1981). "The marketing magic of L.L.Bean". The Boston Globe. Archived from the original on July 8, 2007.
- Reidy, Chris (July 28, 2000). "Journey of discovery". The Boston Globe. Archived from the original on July 8, 2007.
- Sharp, David (March 14, 2011). "LL Bean Reverses 2 Years of Sales Declines". ABC News. Associated Press.
