= Christopher McCormick =

Christopher McCormick (born in Bridgeport, Connecticut) is the former chief executive officer of L.L.Bean, a mail-order, online and retail company based in Freeport, Maine.

== Early life ==
Chris McCormick graduated from Fairfield University Dolan School of Business in 1977 and attended the Harvard Business School six-week Advanced Management Program in 2000.

== Career ==
McCormick joined the company in 1983 as an advertising manager and was the chief marketing officer before assuming the role of president and CEO in May 2001. He is the first non-family member to have held this position at L.L. Bean. Chris McCormick handled the transition of LL Bean towards retail and digital sales channels. The company had been experiencing flat sales since 1995, and 1,000 jobs were cut. In 2006, LL Bean opened a store in Burlington, Massachusetts, and McCormick announced 26 new store openings for the coming years. By 2007, the company had 22 retail and factory outlet shops in the USA, and 15 in Japan. McCormick announced its intention to develop the company's business in Canada and Latin America.

In March 2014, McCormick announced his intention to step down as CEO of LL Bean. On November 3, 2015, Stephen M. Smith was named the fourth President and CEO of L.L.Bean, and shortly thereafter McCormick retired from the company.

McCormick is a member of the Advisory Council of the Charles F. Dolan School of Business at Fairfield University. In June 2018, he joined the board of directors of the American retail store Big Lots.
