= DJ Cuppy =

Nigerian disc jockey and record producer (born 1992)

- Cuppy performing in Accra in 2026

Background information
- Born: Florence Ifeoluwa Otedola; 11 November 1992 (age 33); Lagos, Nigeria
- Genre: Afrobeats
- Occupations: DJ; record producer; remixer
- Instrument: Mixer
- Years active: 2013–present
- Label: Red Velvet Music Group
- Website: http://djcuppy.com/

Florence Ifeoluwa Otedola (born 11 November 1992), professionally known as DJ Cuppy or simply Cuppy, is a Nigerian disc jockey, musician, record producer and philanthropist. She founded the Cuppy Foundation in 2018. Born and raised in Lagos, she moved to London at the age of 13. She is the daughter of Nigerian businessman Femi Otedola.

== Early life and education ==
Cuppy lived in Ilupeju for six years before moving to Ikeja, where she attended Grange School, Ikeja. She then relocated to London, England, for her GCSEs and A-Levels. She graduated from King's College London in July 2014, with a degree in business and economics. She earned a master's degree in music business from New York University in 2015, followed by a master's degree in African studies at the University of Oxford, where she matriculated in 2021 and graduated in 2022.

== Career ==
In 2014, Cuppy was the resident DJ at the MTV Africa Music Awards in Durban. She subsequently performed at the Tatler and Christie's Art Ball in London, and at the Financial Times Business of Luxury Summit in Mexico City.

She released her first compilation mix, House of Cuppy, in 2014, featuring electronic remixes of songs by leading afropop artists. It was launched in New York on 2 September 2014. That year, she also founded the London-based music management and content production business, Red Velvet Music Group.

In 2015, Cuppy appeared on the cover of the Guardian Life magazine with the cover celebrating "a new generation of African women." In March 2015, Cuppy was named the official DJ for the 2015 Oil Barons Charity in Dubai, and became the first African act to perform at the event. She was featured in the 2015 April/May issue of Forbes Woman Africa. In June of that year, Cuppy released House of Cuppy II, and later that year, interned at Jay-Z's Roc Nation.

Cuppy began releasing original music in 2017 with "Green Light", featuring Nigerian singer and producer Tekno. Her subsequent singles included collaborations with Sarkodie, L.A.X, Skuki, Kwesi Arthur and Zlatan. In 2020, she released "Jollof On The Jet", featuring Rema and Rayvanny, followed by her debut studio album, Original Copy.

In 2020, Cuppy was included in Forbes Magazine's 30 under 30 list and became the inaugural host of Apple Music's Africa Now Radio on Apple Music Beats 1, signifying it as their first radio show in Africa. In 2021, Cuppy was announced as one of the cast members for the Channel 4 reality TV show High Life and presented the Sunday edition of BBC Radio 1Xtra's breakfast show from January to August 2022.

== Artistry ==
Cuppy has described her sound as "Neo-Afrobeats", combining elements of Electro house music and Afrobeats.

== Personal life ==
=== Spirituality ===
Cuppy is a practising Christian. In September 2024, she revealed that she had been baptised the previous summer. In January 2026, she announced a temporary break from social media ahead of a planned 21-day biblical fast, citing a desire for personal reflection and spiritual focus.

== Philanthropy ==
Cuppy launched the Cuppy Foundation in July 2018. The following year, the foundation organised the Gold Gala, raising more than ₦5 billion for the Save the Children's work in Nigeria. Nigerian businessman Aliko Dangote and her father, Femi Otedola, donated to the cause.

Her later philanthropic work has focused particularly on widening access to education. In 2023, she donated £100,000 to the Africa Oxford Initiative to establish the Cuppy Africa Oxford Scholars Fund, supporting African graduate students experiencing unexpected financial need. She subsequently extended this work across her other alma maters, establishing the Cuppy Africa Steinhardt Scholars Fund at New York University in 2024 and, through the Cuppy Foundation, the Cuppy Fund at King's College London in 2025. Both provide financial support to African students facing hardship during their studies.

== Ambassadorship and advocacy ==
In 2014, Cuppy was appointed tourism ambassador for Nigeria's "Fascinating Nigeria" campaign by the country's Minister of Tourism, Culture and National Orientation, Edem Duke.

In March 2018, she became one of four official Pepsi DJ ambassadors in Nigeria and appeared in the company's all-star "#NaijaAllTheWay" campaign ahead of the 2018 World Cup. She was appointed a Global Citizen Education Ambassador in June 2018 and an ambassador for Save The Children UK later that year. In July 2021, she became an ambassador for the Lagos SDGs Youth Alliance.

In 2023, Cuppy became the first-ever international celebrity ambassador for His Majesty King Charles III's The King's Trust, where she advocates for youth empowerment. In September 2024, Cuppy moderated the opening session of the United Nations General Assembly, focusing on sustainable development and youth leadership. She became the first British Nigerian to host an opening session.

== Discography ==
=== Album ===
Original Copy (2020)
Title	Featured artists
Epe	feat. Efya
Jollof on the Jet	feat. Rema & Rayvanny
Wale	feat Wyclef Jean
Feel Good	feat. Fireboy DML
Cold Heart Killer	feat. Darkoo
Original Copy (Interlude)	
Karma	feat. Stonebwoy
Litty Lit	feat. Teni
54	feat. Julian Marley & Sir Shina Peters
Guilty Pleasure	feat. Nonso Amadi
P.O.Y.	feat. Ycee & Ms Banks
Labalaba	feat. Seyi Shay

=== Singles ===
Title	Artists	Year
"Green Light"	Cuppy featuring Tekno	2017
"Vybe"	Cuppy featuring Sarkodie	2018
"Currency"	Cuppy featuring L.A.X	2018
"Werk"	Cuppy featuring Skuki	2018
"Abena"	Cuppy featuring Kwesi Arthur, Shaydee, Ceeza Milli	2019
"Gelato"	Cuppy featuring Zlatan Ibile	2019
"Jollof on the Jet"	Cuppy featuring Rema and Rayvanny	2020
"Karma"	Cuppy featuring Stonebwoy	2020
"Fkn Around"	Cuppy featuring Megan Thee Stallion	2020
"Litty Lit"	Cuppy featuring Teni	2020

== See also ==
- List of Nigerian DJs
- List of Yoruba people
