= Bon chic bon genre =

French high-class subculture and fashion

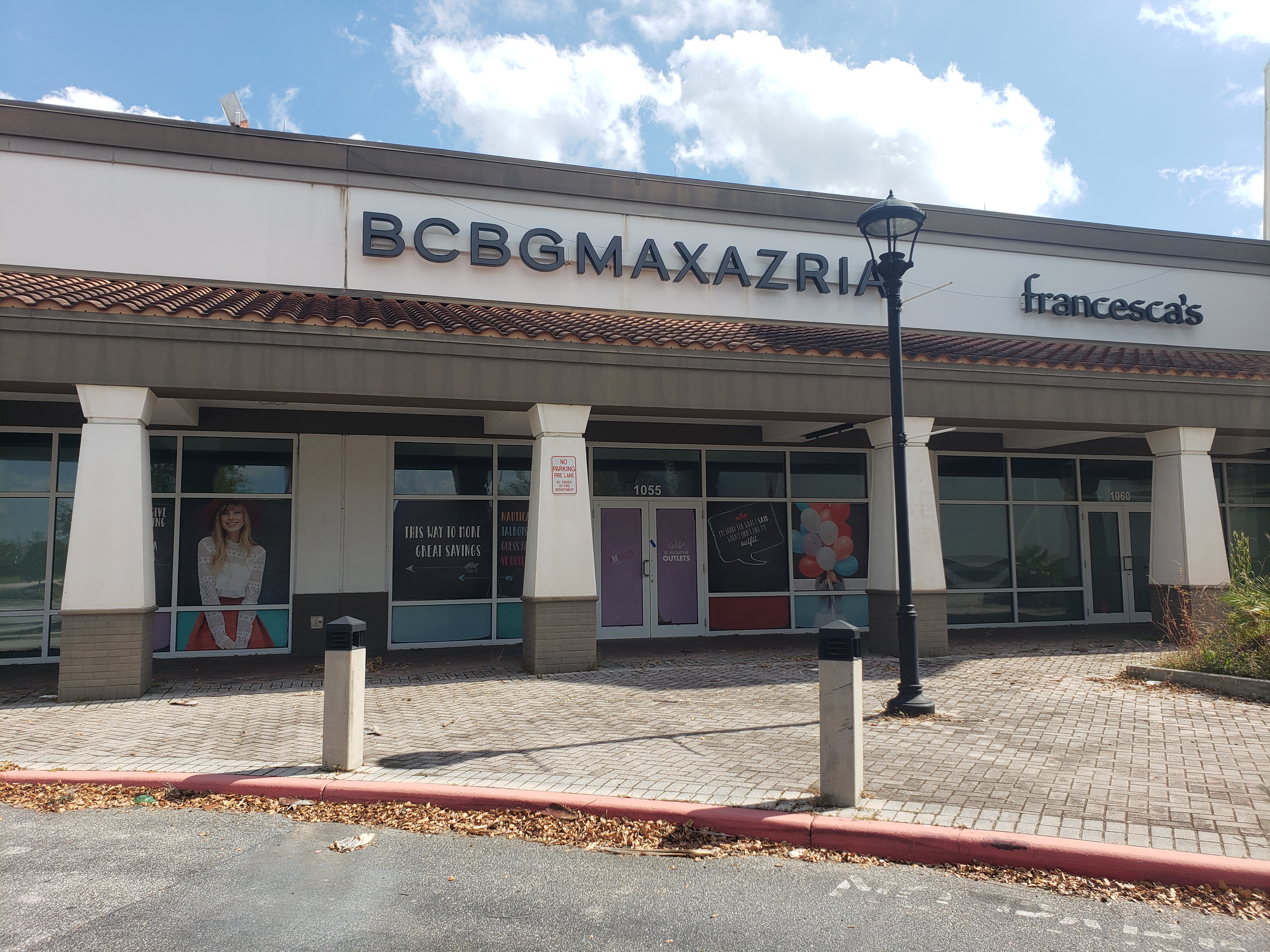
A BCBG Max Azria store in St Augustine, Florida, which takes its name from the BCBG term.

Bon chic, bon genre (French for 'good style, good class'; IPA: [bɔ̃ ʃik bɔ̃ ʒɑ̃ʁ]) is an expression used in France to refer to a subculture of stylish members of the Parisian upper class. They are typically well-educated, well-connected, and descended from "old money" families, preferably with some aristocratic ancestry. The style combines certain fashionable tastes with the appearance of social respectability. The expression is sometimes shortened to BCBG (the fashion company BCBG Max Azria was named in reference to the subculture).

Parallels are often seen between this subculture and similar upper-class social groups in the United States ("preppy") and the United Kingdom ("Sloane Rangers"). As with those groups, the BCBG subculture drew mainstream attention during the 1980s. Thierry Mantoux published a handbook for BCBG style (BCBG – Le guide du bon chic bon genre) in 1985. It was a French equivalent to The Official Preppy Handbook and The Sloane Ranger Handbook, both published earlier in the decade.

The BCBG social group is associated with certain residential areas in Paris and Versailles. It is often identified with the 'NAP' area formed by the triangle between Neuilly-Auteuil-Passy, from the 16th arrondissement to the Bois de Boulogne, as well as the 6th arrondissement closer to the centre of Paris. It is associated with the 7th and 8th arrondissements for shopping.

The BCBG subculture is not to be confused with the French socio-economic group known as 'bobo' (a portmanteau of bourgeois and bohemian).

== Fashion ==
The BCBG style tends toward the conservative and classic, to "de-emphasize 'sexiness' and 'flashy' signs of wealth", and it is influenced by British and American fashion. Some brands trendy with the BCBG group include Gucci, Max Mara, Le Bon Marché and Chanel.

Examples of the BCBG style are seen in Clive James's first Postcard from... television series, when he visits Paris during the "Postcard from Paris" episode (1989). While he is sitting in a cafe, people demonstrating 'good BCBG' are pointed out to him.

== See also ==
- Tout-Paris
- Ton (society)
