= The Official Preppy Handbook =

Humorous 1980 book on preppy culture

- Cover of first edition
- Author: Lisa Birnbach; Jonathan Roberts; Carol McD. Wallace; Mason Wiley
- Illustrator: Oliver Williams
- Language: English
- Subject: Humor; Secondary education
- Publisher: Workman Publishing
- Publication date: October 1980
- Publication place: United States
- Media type: Paperback book
- Pages: 224
- ISBN: 0-89480-140-6; 978-0-89480-140-2
- OCLC: 6762701
- Dewey Decimal: 373.2/22/0973
- LC Class: LC58.7 .O35 1980
- Followed by: True Prep: It's a Whole New Old World

The Official Preppy Handbook (1980) is a satirical reference guide edited by Lisa Birnbach and written by Jonathan Roberts, Carol McD. Wallace, Mason Wiley, and Birnbach. It discusses an aspect of North American culture described as prepdom. In addition to insights on prep school and university life at socially acceptable schools, it illuminates many aspects of the conservative upper middle class, old money WASP society. Topics range from appropriate clothing for social events to choosing the correct college and major.

The book addresses "preppy" life from birth to old age, lending understanding to the cultural aspects of "preppy" life. In general, elementary and secondary school, college, and the young adult years receive the most attention. Coverage lessens during the book's latter chapters. The book was first published in 1980 by Workman Publishing.

== Overview ==
The Official Preppy Handbook explains and satirizes what it takes to be a preppy person in the 1980s, parodying the lifestyle of the WASP elite. Birnbach reveals through an ironic tone where preps go to school, where they summer, what brands they wear, and how they decorate their homes. Birnbach divides The Official Preppy Handbook into seven sections, each devoted to a different period of the preppy lifestyle. The Handbook begins by caricaturizing the childhood of a preppy person in 1980. Lisa Birnbach satirizes a prep’s ideal family lifestyle, and humorously advises readers how to pick, interview, and gain acceptance into a prep school. The book then wittily discusses “the best years of your life” – a prep’s college years. With tongue in cheek, Birnbach elucidates which college courses to take, how to design one’s dorm room, and how to party at college. In Chapters 5 and 6, the book explains the prep adult life as first a “young executive”, and later as a retired adult in “the Country Club Years”. Birnbach jokingly educates readers on navigating a cocktail party, networking, and vacationing. The Official Preppy Handbook also teaches readers how to dress preppily. In chapter 4, Birnbach emphasizes the importance of appearing effortless, preppy and casual, writing, “socks are frequently not worn on sporting occasions or on social occasions for that matter. This provides a year round beachside look that is so desirable that comfort may be thrown aside”.

== Effect ==
The book's reflections on young urban professional culture inspired Arthur Cinader, the founder of the J. Crew clothing line. Cinader hoped to capitalize on the book's success.

The book also represented a resurgence of interest in preppy culture that aided the growth of retailer L.L. Bean, which the book describes as "nothing less than Prep mecca." The book's exposé of university life and the drug and sex culture at various schools had a significant impact on public thought about those schools. The book spawned many other "official" handbooks for other American subcultures.

The Handbook exposed preppy culture to the masses, and helped to democratize the preppy subculture. Prior to the book, primarily only wealthy WASP elites adopted the preppy subculture. From the 1920s, WASPs dominated American universities, and preppy fashion was traditionally worn on university campuses. However, as universities became less exclusive as a result of economic and cultural shifts, preppiness as a subculture became less exclusive. Preppy fashion adopted new nuances, and preppy culture has become more inclusive. By writing The Official Preppy Handbook, Lisa Birnbach helped to further democratize preppy fashion and culture. Birnbach explained in her introduction that the handbook is not intended as an exclusive text describing preppiness as subculture reserved for “an elite minority lucky enough to attend prestigious private schools”. Rather, the Handbook was written as a guidepost for the revival of the preppy style. It shared the secrets of the preppy code, making preppy seem “neat, attractive, and suddenly attainable”.

== See also ==
- The Official Sloane Ranger Handbook, a roughly contemporaneous British book on a similar subject
