= Leon Leonwood Bean =

American businessman (1872–1967)

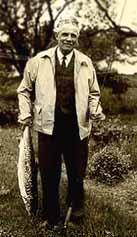
- Born: October 13, 1872; Greenwood, Maine, US
- Died: February 5, 1967 (aged 94); Pompano Beach, Florida, US
- Resting place: Webster Cemetery, Freeport, Maine
- Occupations: Inventor; author; entrepreneur
- Known for: Founding L.L.Bean
- Spouses: Bertha Davis Porter m. 1898; Lucille Claire Boudreau m. 1941
- Children: Lester Carl; Charles Warren; Barbara
- Relatives: Linda Bean (granddaughter)

Leon Leonwood Bean (October 13, 1872 – February 5, 1967) was an American inventor, author, outdoor enthusiast, and founder of the company L.L.Bean.

== History ==
Bean as a child with his mother, Sarah

Bean was born in the town of Greenwood, Maine, on October 13, 1872, to Benjamin Warren Bean and Sarah (Swett) Bean, one of six sons. According to a grandson of Leon L. Bean, the latter's middle name may have been originally "Linwood" and accidentally changed to "Leonwood". In the Freeport Town Clerk's Report for the 1898–1899 period, a "Leon Linwood Bean" married a "Bertha Davis Porter" on September 28, 1898.

Bean showed an early interest in business, earning his first money when he was nine years old. He learned that he could either attend the local fair or sell steel traps to his father, so he decided to sell the traps. Bean's parents died four days apart when Bean was 12 years old. He subsequently moved to South Paris, Maine, to stay with family. When Bean was 13 years old, he killed his first deer, and at 14 sold another that he had shot to two unsuccessful hunters. For two years until he was 18, Bean worked on an uncle's farm in West Minot, while attending school at Hebron Academy in the winter. At 18, Bean worked on a farm in East Hebron. At 19, Bean attended a year long business course at Kents Hill School, paying his way by selling soap.

In 1892, Bean worked in a Bangor creamery, followed by a job clerking in an Auburn clothing store. Bean married Bertha Porter (1865-1939) in 1898. They moved to Freeport, her hometown, where he worked in his brother Otho's dry goods and clothing store. They raised three children, Lester Carl "Carlton" (1900–1967), Charles Warren "Warren" (1901–1971), and Barbara (1907–1985), before Bertha died in May 1939, age 73. Lucille Claire "Claire" Boudreau became his second wife in 1941.

== Foundation of L.L.Bean ==
Bean was an avid hunter and fisherman. In his outdoor activities, his boots would become soaked with water, so he set out to resolve this inconvenience and developed plans for a waterproof boot. The boot was a combination of lightweight leather for the upper part and rubber on the bottom. He brought the plans to a cobbler and the first boots were made.

According to Bean, "I took a pair of snow rubbers from the stock on the shelves and had a shoemaker cut out a pair of size 7 tops. The local cobbler stitched the whole thing together." Bean sold a pair to Edgar Conant, his first customer. Over the summer of 1912, Bean sold a hundred pairs. According to Montgomery, Bean "...took rubbers out of his store stock, and got two locals, Mr. and Mrs. Ted Goldrup, to cut out tops and stitch them to the rubbers. The soft, pliable rubber simply ripped apart after a few miles of hard going." Bean felt the boot produced to be of good quality, and obtained a list of non-resident Maine hunting license holders and prepared a descriptive mail order circular. He promised 100% money back for anyone who was unhappy with the boots. Because of this, Bean had to refund 90% of the costs of the first 100 sets of boots made, when the rubber on the bottom developed cracks. He seemed not to mind returning the money, and the popularity of the boots was clear.

In 1911, Bean took out a loan in the amount of US$400 and set off to Boston, where he offered the United States Rubber Company the remainder of his US$400 to produce a better quality boot for him. With the better quality boots available, Bean set up a boot shop in his brother's basement in Freeport, Maine. His skills and trials as an entrepreneur, along with his promise to return 100% money back on all items, were detailed by many local and national newspapers of the time. By 1917, he had sold enough of his boots to buy a dedicated building for his shop on the main street of Freeport. In 1918, Bean realized the importance of patenting his invention. As the patent was granted, he moved on to inventing and improving more outdoor equipment and expanding his store. He hired the daughter of his first customers, Hazel Goldrup, as a full-time bookkeeper and cashier. In 1918, he moved to a new building across the street, and by 1920, owned it. According to Montgomery, "All of this had been accomplished on the strength of direct-mail sales, especially through the out-of-state license list."

During World War II, Bean served as a consultant for the U.S. Army and Navy, while his company manufactured a version of the Maine Hunting Shoe for military use.

Gross sales for his company amounted to $1 million in 1946, increasing to $3 million in 1967.

== As an author ==
Bean published a book in 1942, called Hunting, Fishing and Camping and an autobiography, in 1960, called My Story: the Autobiography of a Down-East Merchant.

== Death and legacy ==
Bean died in Pompano Beach, Florida, on February 5, 1967, at the age of 94. He was buried in Webster Cemetery in Freeport, Maine. At the time of his death, the annual sales of L.L. Bean were around 5 million dollars. Company policy of giving 100% money back on returned products applied until February 9, 2018.

Maine Medical Center has named one of its wings in his honor. In addition, his portrait hangs in a ground-floor corridor at the hospital.
