= Sloane Ranger =

United Kingdom subculture/stereotype

A Sloane Ranger, or simply a Sloane, is a stereotypical upper-middle or upper-class person in the United Kingdom, typically although not necessarily a young one, who embodies a very particular upbringing and outlook. The style, described in the 1982 book The Official Sloane Ranger Handbook, is characterised by conservative, branded heritage clothing typically associated with aristocratic fashion. Its counterpart in the United States is the preppy style and in France is bon chic bon genre.

The term is a pun based on references to Sloane Square, a location in Chelsea, London, famed for the wealth of its residents and frequenters, and the television character The Lone Ranger.

== Origin ==
The coinage came from Martina (Tina) Margetts, a sub-editor on Harpers & Queen who worked on the 1975 article. In her early twenties she had found herself amongst this social group while undertaking a course on fine art at the Victoria and Albert Museum.

Initially, the term "Sloane Ranger" was used mostly in reference to women, a particular archetype being Diana, Princess of Wales. However, the term now usually includes men. A male Sloane has also been referred to as a "Rah" and by the older term "Hooray Henry".

Although Sloanes are nowadays supposedly more widely spread and amorphous than in the past, they are still perceived to socialise in the expensive areas of west London, most notably King's Road, Fulham Road, Kensington High Street, and other areas of Kensington, Chelsea and Fulham. The pubs and nightclubs in these areas are popular with Sloanes, in particular the White Horse pub, known as the "Sloaney Pony", in Fulham, and Admiral Codrington, known as "The Cod", in Chelsea.

In 2015, Peter York argued that the Sloane population has been winnowed and that Sloanes were more likely to be leading the British trend to downward social mobility. In 2023, Tatler announced that it was time for the Sloane Rangers to "step aside" for the Bopeas, or Bohemian Peasants, a term and social theory describing downwardly mobile elite embracing a "rural life of making, brewing, fermenting and foraging".

== Sloanes ==
The following people have been considered by some to be Sloanes:

- Jemima Goldsmith
- James Hewitt, Army officer and lover of Diana, Princess of Wales
- Tara Palmer-Tomkinson
- Trinny and Susannah
- Catherine, Princess of Wales
- Sarah, Duchess of York

== See also ==
- Bon chic bon genre
- Bourgeois personality
- British country clothing
- Class conflict
- Fuerdai
- I.J.G.B.
- International Debutante Ball
- Sloane Street
- Trixie (slang)
- Upper Class Twit of the Year (parody)
- Young fogey
