= Go-to-hell pants =

Type of slacks that have garish colors or patterns

- Type: trousers

Go-to-hell pants are a type of slacks that have garish colors or patterns.

The trousers have a classic cut. They are worn as casual dress, but typically the only outlandish piece in an outfit. Lime green is a popular color, but other colors are common. Patterns or embroidered figures are common as well, as long as they are not too transgressive.

The term dates to the 1910s and refers to fashion disregarding norms of good taste. The pants became very popular among east-coast elites in the 1950s. They came back into fashion in 2021.
