= Smart Fortwo =

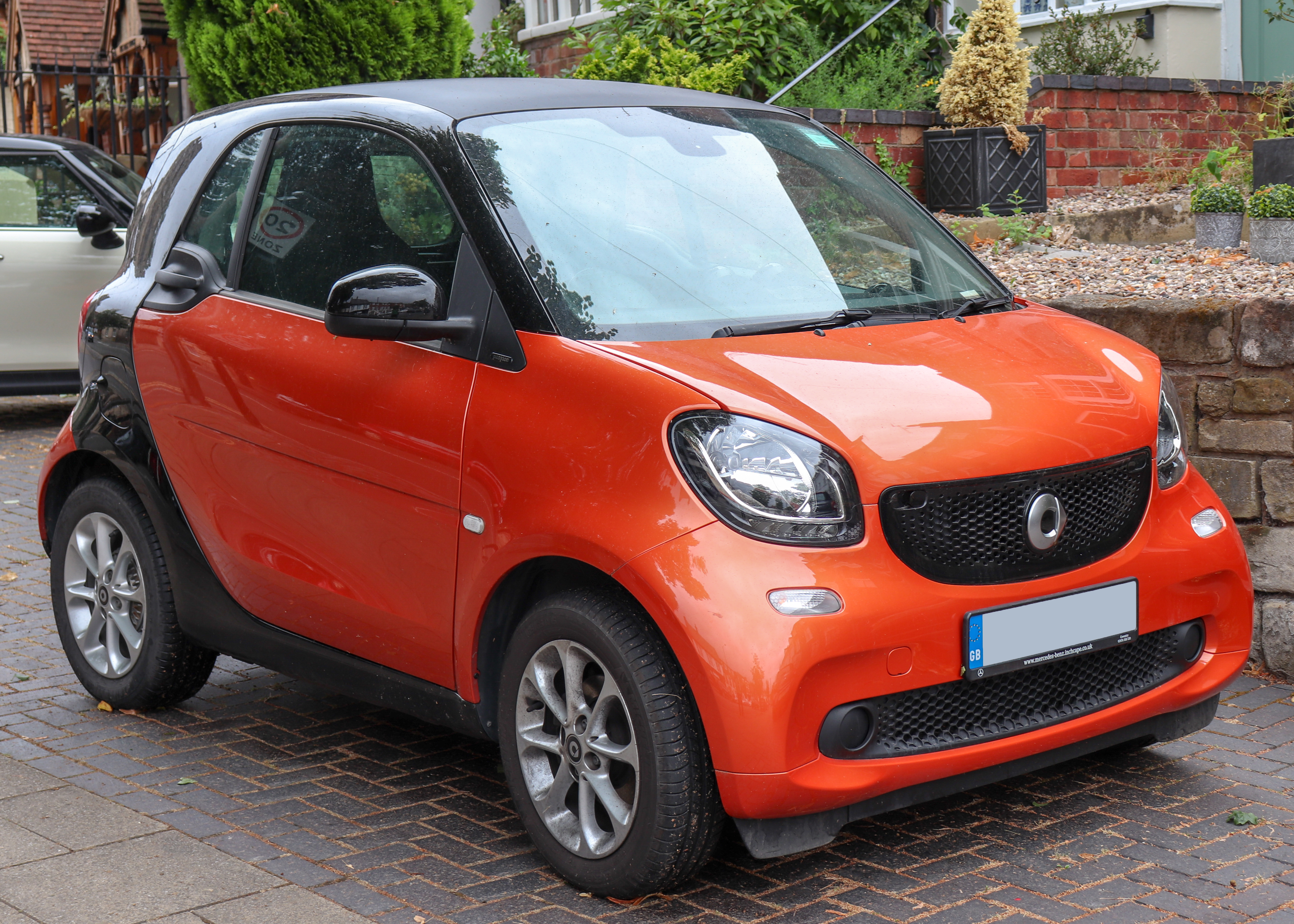
- 2016 Smart Fortwo Passion

Overview
- Manufacturer: Daimler-Benz (1998); DaimlerChrysler (1998–2007); Daimler AG (2007–2022); Mercedes-Benz Group (2022–2024)
- Also called: Smart City-Coupé (1998–2002); Smart car (colloquially)
- Production: 1998–2006 (MkI); 2006–2014 (MkII); 2014–2024 (MkIII)
- Assembly: France: Hambach (Smartville)

Body and chassis
- Class: City car Microcar
- Body style: 3-door hatchback 2-door convertible
- Layout: Rear-engine, rear-wheel-drive Rear-motor, rear-wheel-drive (electric version)
- Related: Smart Roadster; Smart Forfour

Chronology
- Successor: Smart #2

The Smart Fortwo (stylized as "smart fortwo") is a two-seater city car manufactured and marketed by the Smart division of the Mercedes-Benz Group for model years 1998–2024. The car was sold across three generations — each using a rear-engine, rear-wheel-drive layout and a (generally) one-box design body shape. Much like the original Volkswagen Beetle decades earlier, the Fortwo"s identity is interchangeably associated with both its brand name and its model name, earning it simple colloquial name, the "Smart car".

The first generation Smart ForTwo (a joint venture project between Mercedes-Benz and Swatch) was internally designated as the W450, and was publicly launched at the 1998 Paris Motor Show. The redesigned (but visually similarly-shaped) second generation W451 would debut 8 years later, at the 2006 Bologna Motor Show. The third (and currently final) generation Fortwo was the C453 build series. It debuted globally on July 16, 2014, at the Tempodrom in Berlin. The third generation coupe and convertible debuted along with a closely related four-door version. While the four door carried the previously-used Smart Forfour name, this generation of smart cars was actually co-developed (sharing the same platform and engines) with the third-generation Renault Twingo.

The ForTwo was marketed in 46 countries worldwide, allowing production to reach 1.7 million units by early 2015, and going on to surpass 2 million units globally, before end of 3rd generation production.

The Smart moniker was derived as a portmanteau of three words from the project's early history as a cooperative design and engineering venture between Swatch and Mercedes resulting in the words: Swatch, Mercedes, and ART merging to simply become 'Smart'. The Fortwo model nameplate derives from the vehicle's two-person seating capacity. (In much of the marketing up until 2002 however, the Fortwo had been marketed as the "Smart City-Coupé"). Following this theme, the larger Smart car received the "ForFour" name, to emphasize that model's intended size/capacity.

A low-slung, somewhat related Roadster/coupe-style car, simply called the (R452/C452) 'Smart Roadster' was also produced early on in the 2000s, but it did not sell in great volumes and did not see a second generation. A mechanically unrelated and even larger 4-door off-road/crossover Smart was designed and developed in-house by Mercedes, and may or may not have been based on the then-outgoing W203 C-class platform. This vehicle (called the Smart "ForMore") was ultimately canceled at the last moment, due to a number of factors, including but not limited to the 2008 financial crisis.

== History ==
Development of what ultimately became the Smart Fortwo started before 1993, originally as the Swatch car, developed by Nicolas Hayek in co-operation with Volkswagen. With a design focused on a modern microcar with an electric or hybrid drive, VW vacillated, disputes with Hayek ensued, and Hayek turned to Mercedes.

The company MCC (Micro Compact Car AG) was founded in 1994 by Hayek in Biel as a joint subsidiary of Daimler-Benz and SMH SA (Société Suisse de Microélectronique et d'Horlogerie). When MCC abandoned the original concept and the planned electric or hybrid drive, both Hayek and senior development team members left the project. "Today's gasoline-powered Smart is a product from Daimler-Benz and has not much in common with the plans of the former Swatch team."

== Design ==
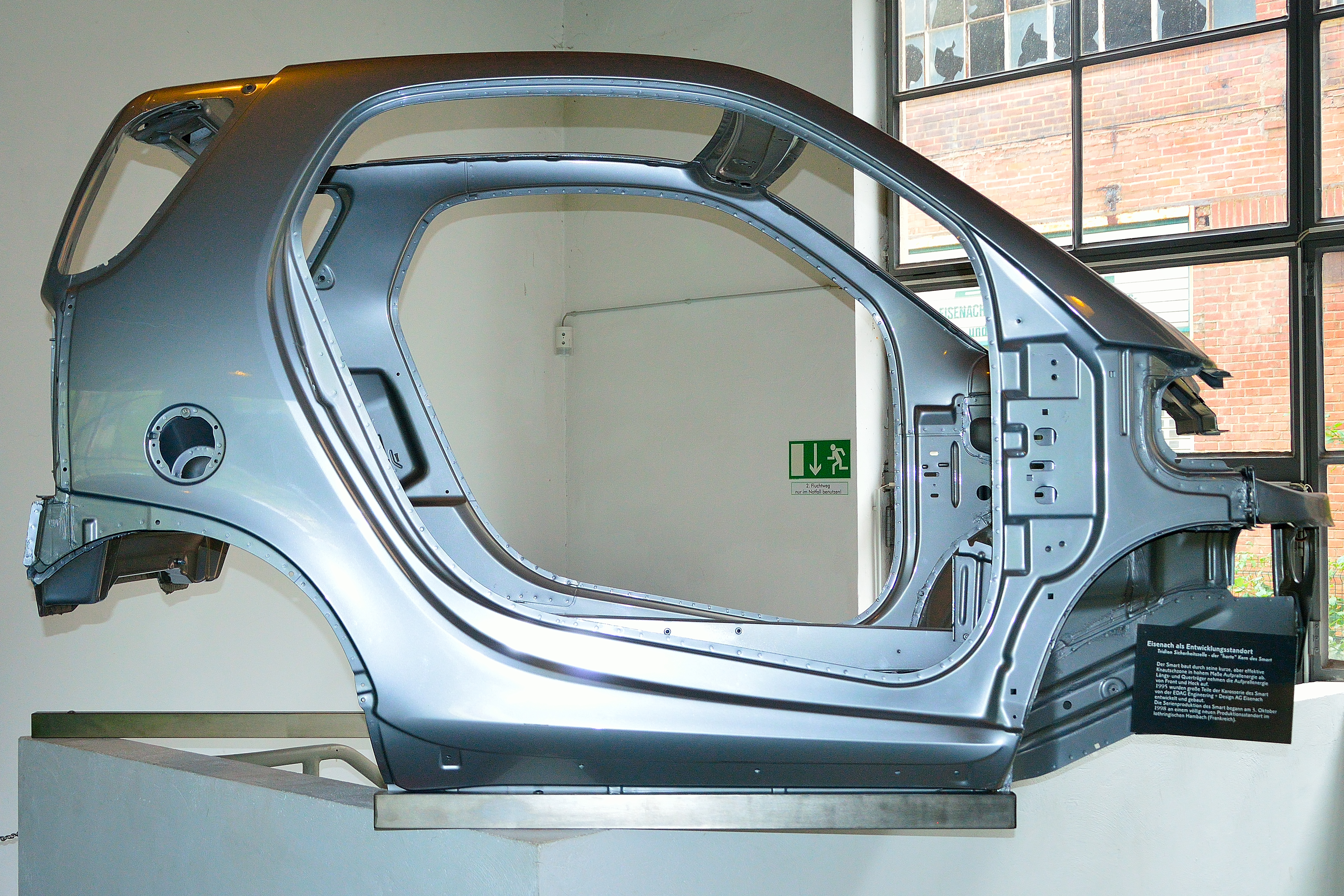
Tridion steel hemispherical safety-cell

The Fortwo is noted for its 2.5–2.69-metre (8.2–8.8 ft) overall length, high H-point seating, offset passenger and driver seats (in the first and second generation, the passenger seat is 15 centimetres further rearward than the driver's), automated manual transmission (1st and 2nd generation), De Dion tube rear suspension, low CO_{2} emissions (119 grams per kilometre, North America, 1.0 Liter), two-part rear hatch, interchangeable plastic body panels and prominent steel hemispherical safety-cell, which is marketed as the Tridion cell and can be ordered in a contrasting color to the vehicle's body panels.

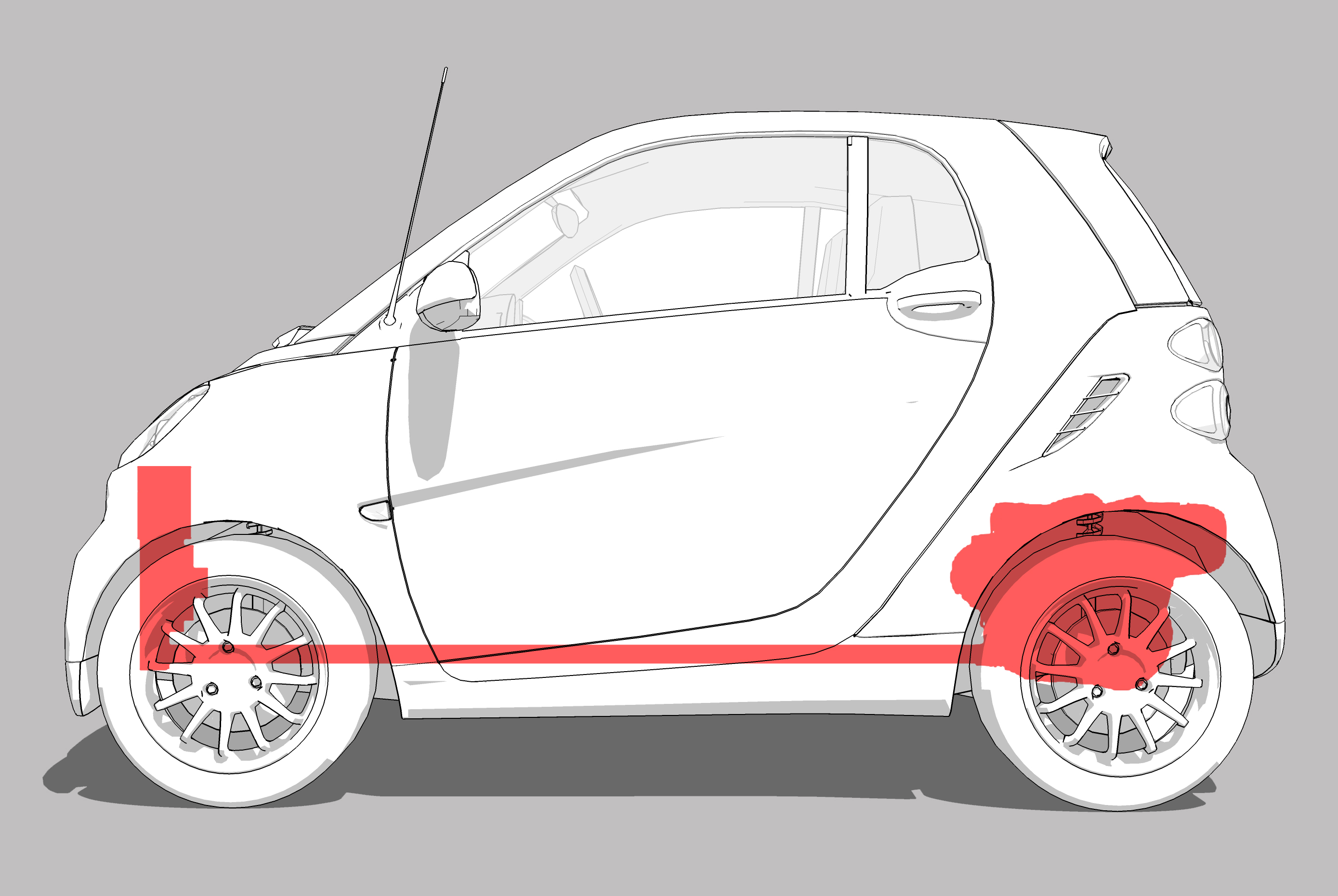
The rear engine and forward cooling system locations in the Smart Fortwo

Fortwo models are manufactured at Smartville—a dedicated Daimler assembly plant in Hambach, France—in Coupé (i.e., hatchback) and Cabrio (i.e., convertible) body styles, each in a mono-box configuration.

Smartville underwent a 200 million euro upgrade beginning in mid-2013 for the third generation.

With the second generation, Smart introduced a version with automatic start-stop, marketed as the MHD, or Micro-Hybrid Drive—offered only in certain markets. A sport model, marketed as the Brabus model, has been available in both generations, and Daimler introduced the Smart electric drive, an all-electric version, in 2007. The Fortwo forms the basis for Daimler's Car2go fleet, the largest car-sharing enterprise worldwide.

In 2002, the New York Museum of Modern Art (MoMa) introduced a first generation ForTwo into its permanent collection (the only vehicle to be included into the collection while still in series production), and in 2014 the Fortwo was voted the Best Microcar for the fifth year in a row by readers of the Chinese edition of Auto, Motor und Sport. At the time of its commercial launch, the Smart Fortwo diesel-engined variant, the Cdi, had the lowest carbon dioxide emissions for an internal combustion engine, at 88 g/km rated NEDC cycle.

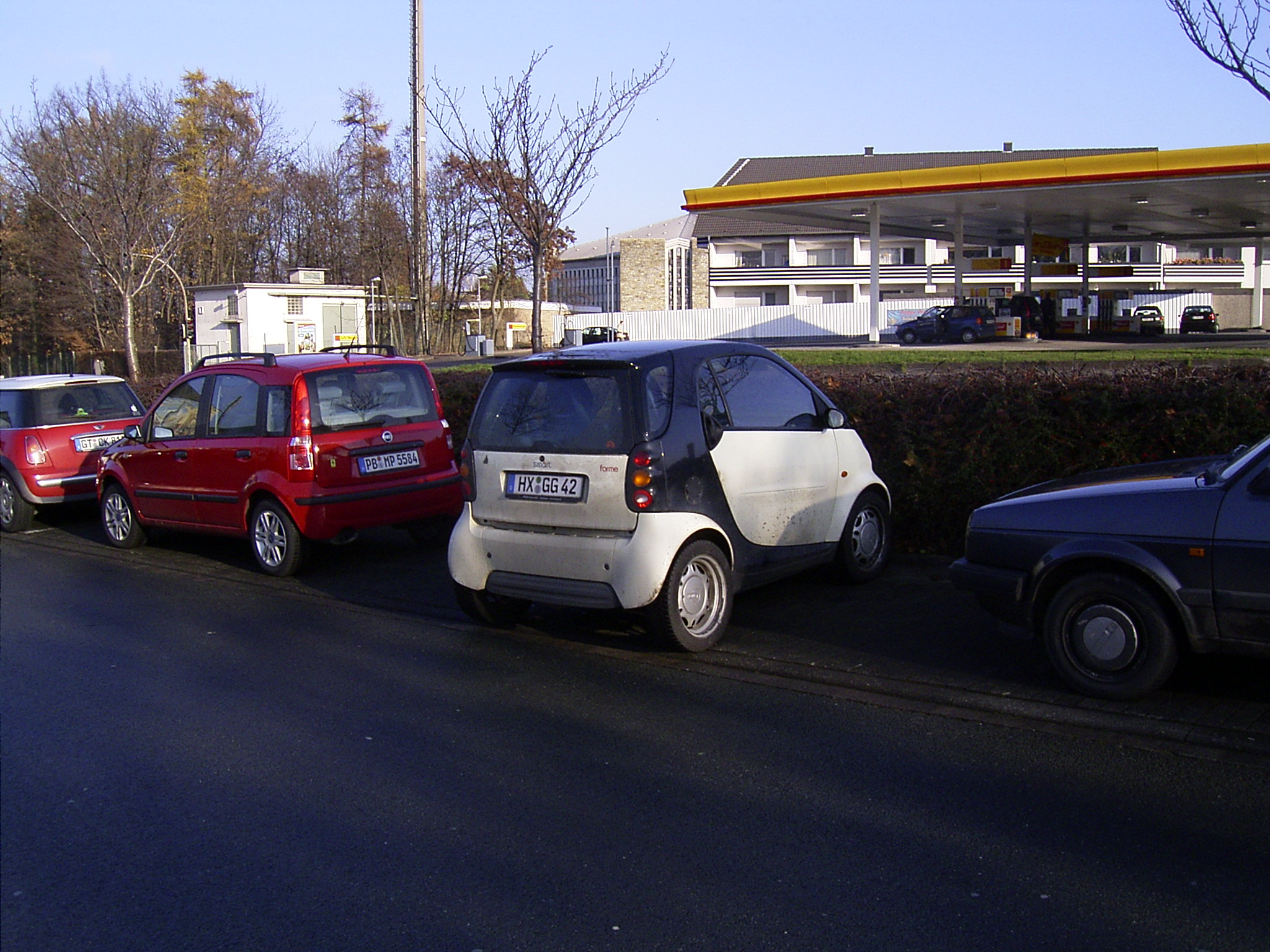
An example of compact parking

Auto, Motor und Sport cites a drag coefficient (Cd) of 0.35 and Alles Auto cites a Cd of 0.345 for the second generation W451 series

=== Transmissions ===
The first and second-generation Fortwo models employ an automated manual transmission, designed and manufactured by Getrag, where the clutch is computer-controlled via electrohydraulics, eliminating the need for a clutch pedal. The first generation used a six-speed version, and the second generation uses a five-speed version, model 5AMT130. Input from floor-mounted shifter or optional steering-wheel-mounted paddles controls a servo-operated clutch and an automated manual gearbox. The vehicle may be driven in automatic mode (early models had the option of fully automatic mode or standard "soft-tip" which was manual mode indicated by no button on the gearshift) or in semi-automatic (half-automatic) mode via paddle-shifters, where the operator controls the shift points but cannot feather or adjust the speed of the clutch.

From 2009, revised transmission software enabled smoother and faster gear changes. The software, available via an ECU upgrade, was also made available for 2008 second generation cars, with a new battery as required.

Third-generation models receive a five-speed manual transmission or six speed dual-clutch automatic transmission.

=== Parking ===
With an overall length (first generation: 2.5 m (98.4 in) approximately equal to the width of regular parking space, a Smart Fortwo can park perpendicularly in spaces typically designed for parallel parking, allowing two Smarts to park in one space—a manner of parking not permissible in many jurisdictions worldwide (e.g. Austria, New Zealand and California).

== First generation (450 series; 1998) ==
First generation
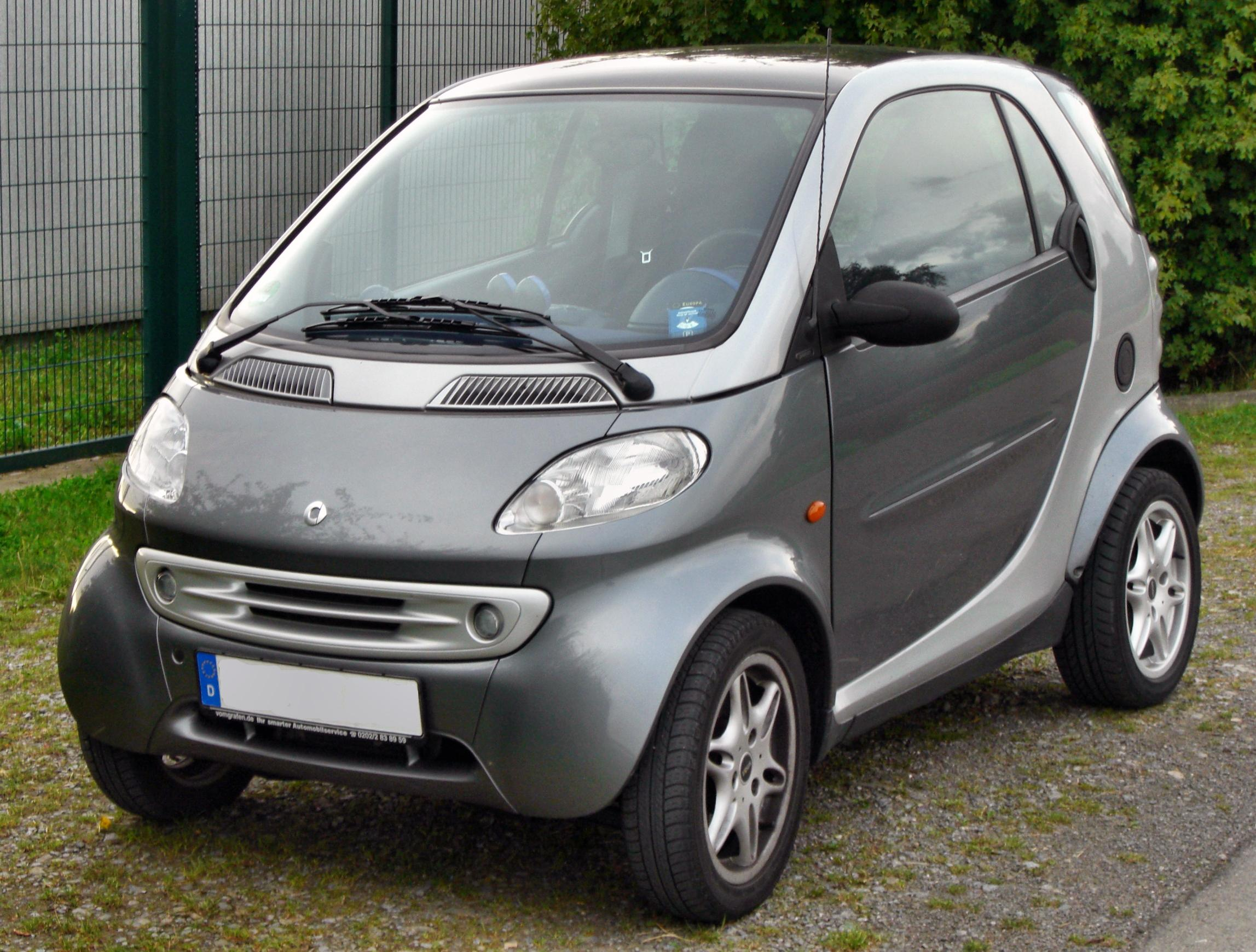

Overview
- Model code: C 450 (Coupé); A 450 (Cabrio); R 450 (Crossblade)
- Also called: smart City-Coupé (1998–2002) smart cabrio (2000–2002) smart fortwo (facelift) smart K (kei) smart coupé
- Production: 1998–2007
- Designer: Gerhard Steinle (Chief Designer)

Body and chassis
- Body style: 3-door hatchback

Powertrain
- Engine: 599 cc M160 E06 turbo I3; 698 cc M160 E07 turbo I3; 799 cc OM660 turbodiesel I3
- Transmission: 6-speed automated manual

Dimensions
- Wheelbase: 1,810 mm (71.3 in)
- Length: 2,500 mm (98.4 in)
- Width: 1,510 mm (59.4 in); K: 1,470 mm (57.9 in)
- Height: 1,500 mm (59.1 in)
- Kerb weight: 730 kg (1,609 lb)

The first-generation, build series MC01 debuted in 1998 and received a facelift in 2002.

=== Engine ===
The engines are turbocharged with three cylinders. Originally the basic petrol engine was 599 cc, and came in three versions—33, 38 and 45 kW (45, 51 and 61 hp). The engine displacement was increased to 698 cc with the facelift in 2002, in 37 and 45 kW (50 and 61 hp) variants. The turbo-diesel engine had 799 cc displacement giving 30 kW (41 hp).

=== Models ===
The Fortwo is available as a coupe or cabriolet, originally called the "City-Coupé" & "cabrio", now the "fortwo" & "fortwo Cabrio", introduced in 2000 and restyled in 2002. Trim levels include the Pure, Pulse, and Passion. Pure models are fitted with the standard audio system but nothing else; Pulse models are fitted with alloy wheels, panoramic glass roof, and paddle-shifters on the steering wheel (2004+); and finally, the Passion models are fitted with air-conditioning and ability to select between fully automatic and sequential gearbox.

- Limited 1: The first limited edition of which 7500 were made, all left-hand drive. It was released at the original launch in 1998. It had a black Tridion cell and white body panels. It also had alloy wheels, a Limited 1 insignia, and a blue interior with beige leather finishings. It was supplied with a certificate showing which numbers out of the 7500, and a plaque with this number below the windshield on the inside.
- SE: This was the second limited edition made by Smart; it was sold in mid-2001 and all were left-hand-drive. They were all Pulse specification with a redesigned steering wheel, soft-touch, air conditioning, CD Multi-changer, and drinks holder as standard. The engine power was upped to 61BHP from the standard 55BHP normally applied to the Pulse in the 600cc G1 cars. It was designated by a SE badge on the boot and was sold in Bay Grey with grey interior and dark blue twist fabric.
- Cdi: has the world's smallest production common-rail direct injection diesel engine. With a consumption of 3.3 litres (NEDC) per 100 kilometres (71.2 mpg) and CO_{2} emissions of just 88 grams per kilometre, it has the lowest current production car CO_{2} emissions worldwide, since Audi and Volkswagen retired its 3-cylinder cars, the A2 1.2 TDI and the Lupo 1.2 TDI respectively.
- Crossblade: a 2002 limited-edition variant of the City Cabrio, a roadster without a windshield, roof, or conventional doors. 2000 were produced. Its weight was still 740 kg (1,631 lb). The Brabus-tuned engine developed 52 kW (71 PS) from its 599 cc engine. After Robbie Williams purchased Crossblade number 008, Smart began a marketing association with him, using him to promote the brand and the new Forfour.
- Crosstown: a convertible with a foldable windshield based on the Fortwo, was presented at IAA Frankfurt in 2005. No plans have been announced to bring this model to market.
- Smart Fortwo Brabus Edition Red: - 35 Coupé and 15 Cabrio models.

Between 2006 and 2007 Brabus produced and sold 50 Smart Fortwo Edition Red cars for the UK market. All of these vehicles were originally produced with a black Tridion safety cell and black plastic panels, the car was then later repainted at Brabus in (EB6 colour code) Intense Red. The car was built with the usual Brabus additions to the exterior, these being Brabus front grille (with fog lights), Brabus front splitter, Brabus side skirts, black plastic Brabus rear exhaust panel and 16 inch Brabus Monoblock alloy wheels. These vehicles were always rumoured to be Brabus Nightrun Fortwo's that were later reworked.

The interior was bespoke to this limited run of vehicles. The interior is half leather and half alcantara with red stitching. The seats use the smaller, non sport foams. This is unusual as all other Brabus 450 Fortwo's use the wider sports style seat foams. The door card inserts are alcantara with leather door pockets with the dash board finished in alcantara with an aluminium Brabus plaque displayed in the centre. None of these vehicles had heated seats or electric door mirrors. All Brabus Edition Red Fortwo's are equipped with a 3-spoke steering wheel, bespoke floor mats, air conditioning, CD player, Brabus clock and rev counter, Brabus speedo displaying 120 mph and all of the removable interior plastics (including door handles and steering wheel trim) repainted in Intense Red to match the exterior.

Designed on the base of the Fortwo Brabus, this limited edition example is powered by a 55 kW 3-cylinder turbo charged engine although all of the upgraded hardware is from the 60 kW motor with a different tune. Brabus upgrades over a standard 698cc Smart Fortwo include a 60 kW camshaft, 60 kW yellow Bosch injectors, 60 kW turbo charger, 60 kW turbo to intercooler pipe (TIK), Brabus branded central twin outlet exhaust with chrome tips, aluminium Brabus intake manifold name plaque and the gearbox from a Smart Roadster (different gear ratios compared with a standard Smart Fortwo).

- Nightrun: includes instrument panels, steering wheel, paddles, shifter, Monoblock VI alloy wheels, leather seats, and engine upgrade from Brabus. Edition Nightrun is only available with the Fortwo coupé/Cabrio.
- Truestyle: painted in metallic ruby red, available in pure trim.
- i-move: a special edition run of 70 Fortwo Cabrio, based on the Passion Cabrio specs with Brabus Monobloc VI wheels, leather interior trim, Lite White panels, an iPod cradle with special edition 20Gb 3G iPod, and an aluminum nameplate on the dash confirmed its special edition status.
- Forfun2 Concept: an off-road version of the Fortwo introduced at the 2005 Athens Motor Show by Greek 4x4 Rally Champion Stefan Attart. It combines the body of a Fortwo with the chassis and drivetrain of a Unimog. It sports monster truck-like 26-inch (66 cm) wheels wrapped in 1.4-metre (4.6 ft) diameter tires and winding keys where the Fortwo's rear wheels are supposed to be.
- Brabus: In 2003 Smart and Brabus introduced the jointly developed version of the Fortwo with the 698cc engine. It had 75 PS (55 kW; 74 hp) of power and 110 Nm of torque. It was available in both coupe and convertible versions. It also featured wider wheels, revised front spoiler and grille, and a revised rear exhaust.
- K: launched in October 2001, exclusively for the Japanese market, it was designed to fit the Japanese kei car regulations. Using specially modified suspension that narrowed the track width, altered tire dimensions, and narrower rear fenders, the vehicle width was reduced to 1.47 m. The engine displacement remained unchanged at 598 cc, as Kei-car standards specify a maximum of under 660 cc (40.3 cu in). Safety features include ESP (Electronic Stability Program) and BAS (Brake Assist System) as standard. The Smart K also facilitates the starting procedure with the Hill Start Assist that makes a starts on slopes easier. The Smart K was discontinued in November 2004.
- Fortwo Edition Limited One: Featured special metallic grey body panels; silver Tridion cell; brown leather for the seating, steering wheel, and shift lever—along with matching floor mats. The model marked the launch of the W451 build series.

Overall, due to poor sales, Daimler lost an estimated €4,470 per first-generation Fortwo produced.

=== Smart Crossblade ===
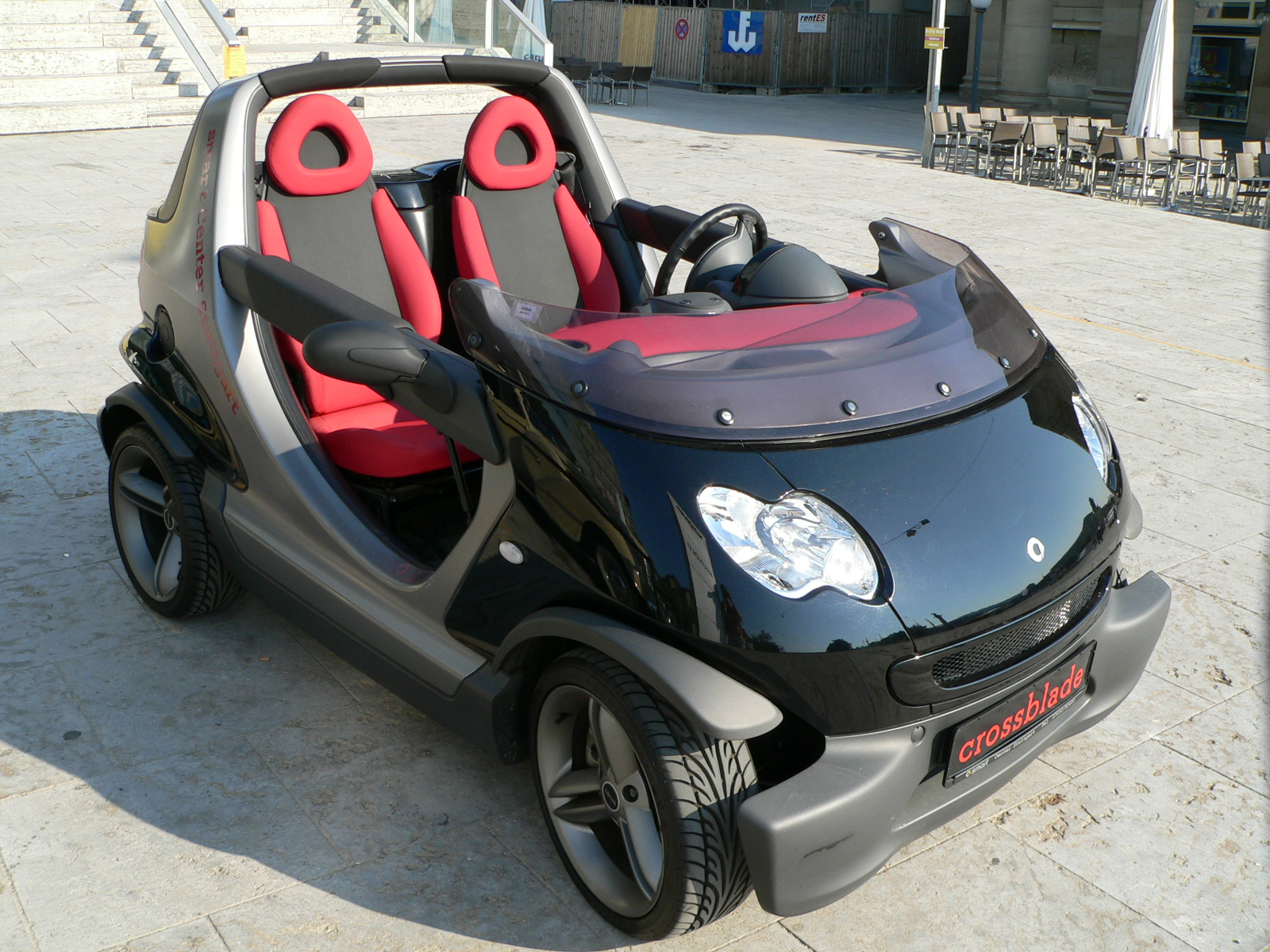
Smart Crossblade

In 2002, a version of the Smart Fortwo without a roof, doors or a proper windshield was created, called the Smart Crossblade. Only 2,000 were built.

=== Safety ===
ANCAP test results* Smart City 2 door coupe (2003)
Test	Score
Overall	3 /5 stars
Frontal offset	7.10/16
Side impact	14.75/16
Pole	Not assessed
Seat belt reminders	0/3
Whiplash protection	Not assessed
Pedestrian protection	Not assessed
Electronic stability control	Not assessed

=== Gallery ===
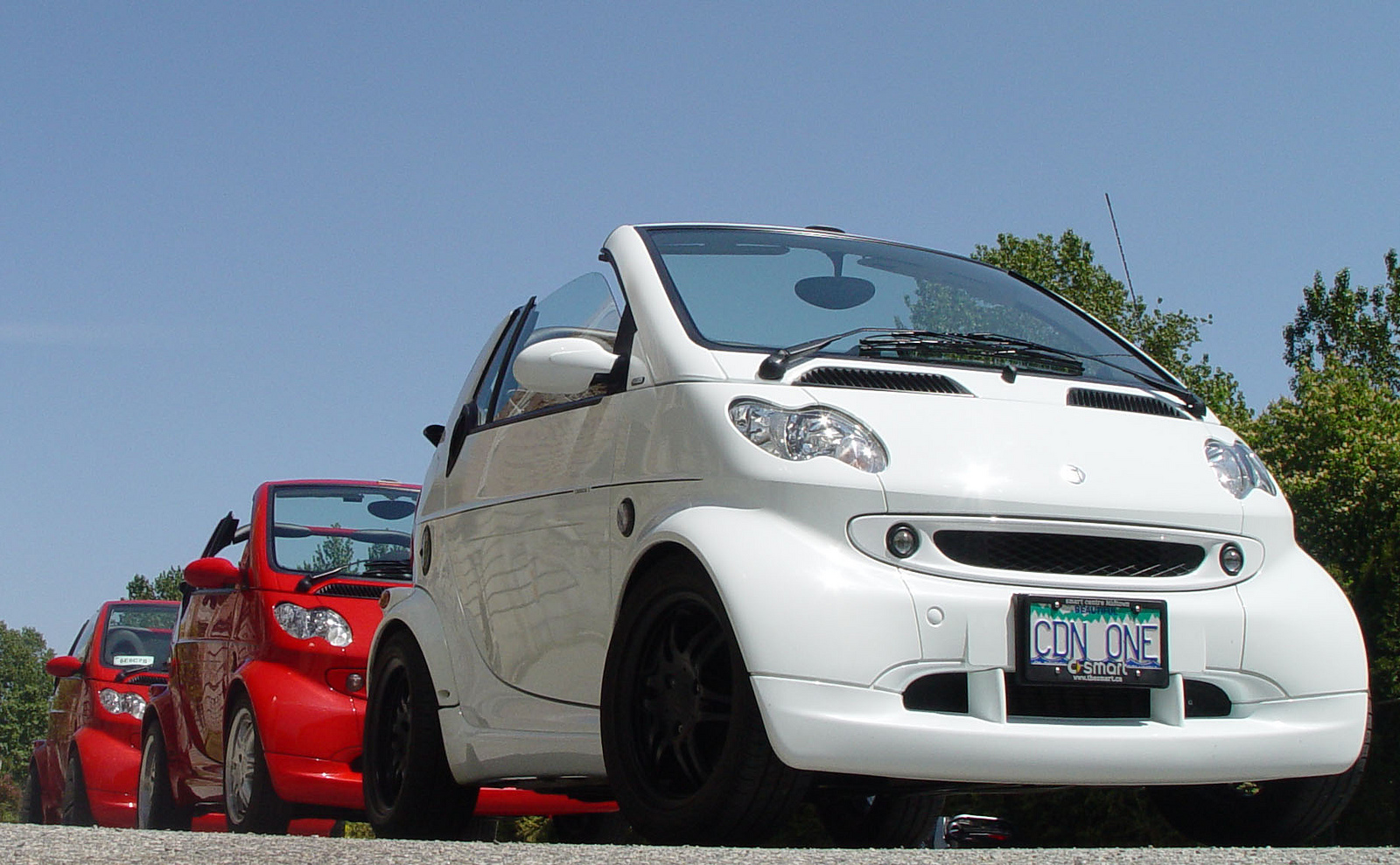
One of four BRABUS Canada 1 cdi cars in Canada

Coupé

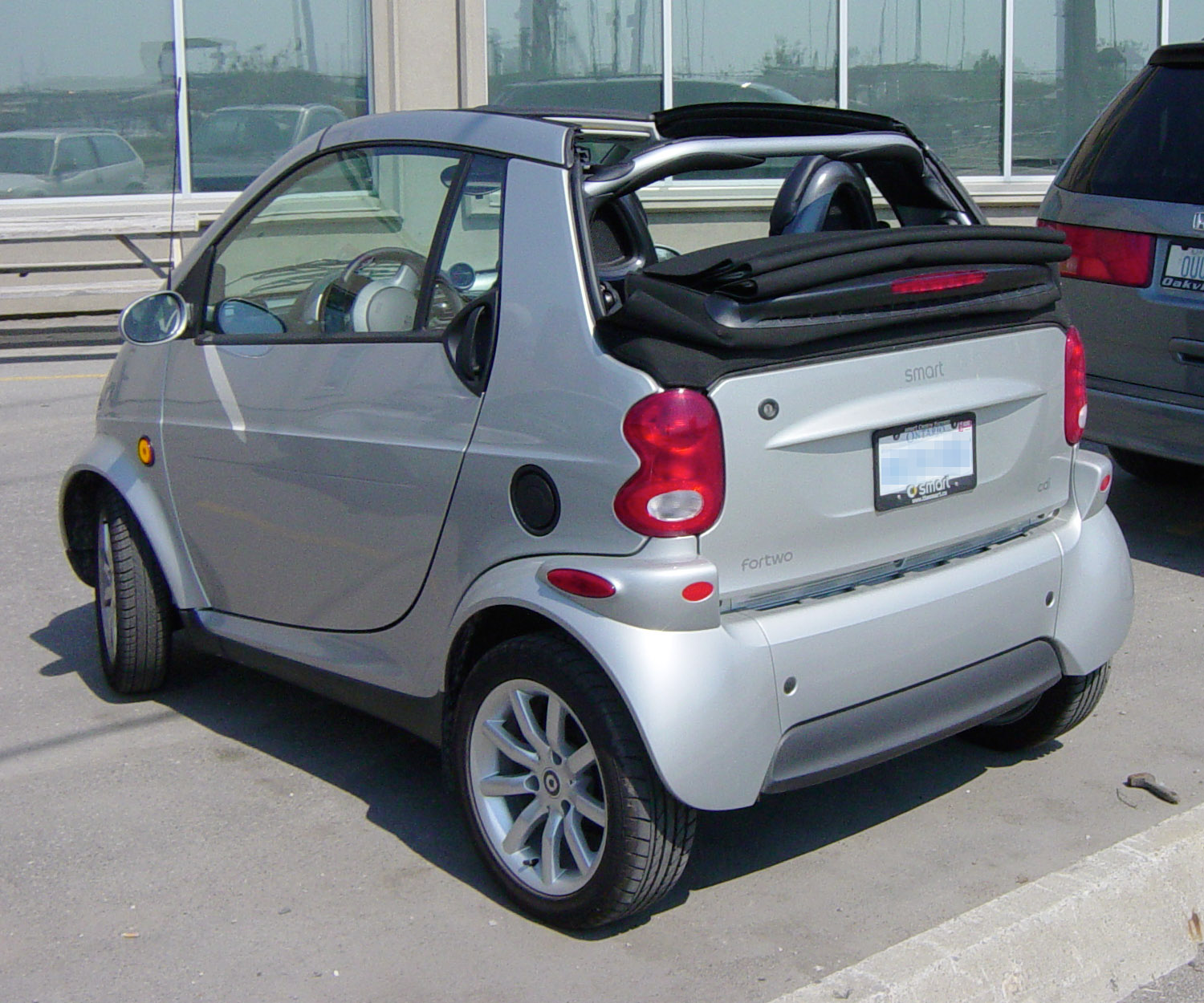
Convertible

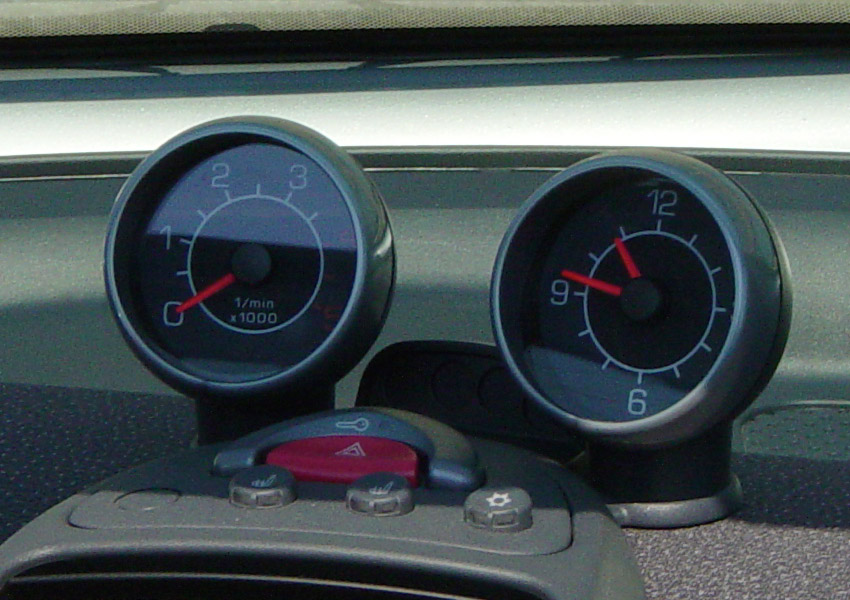
Tachometer generation 450 and clock

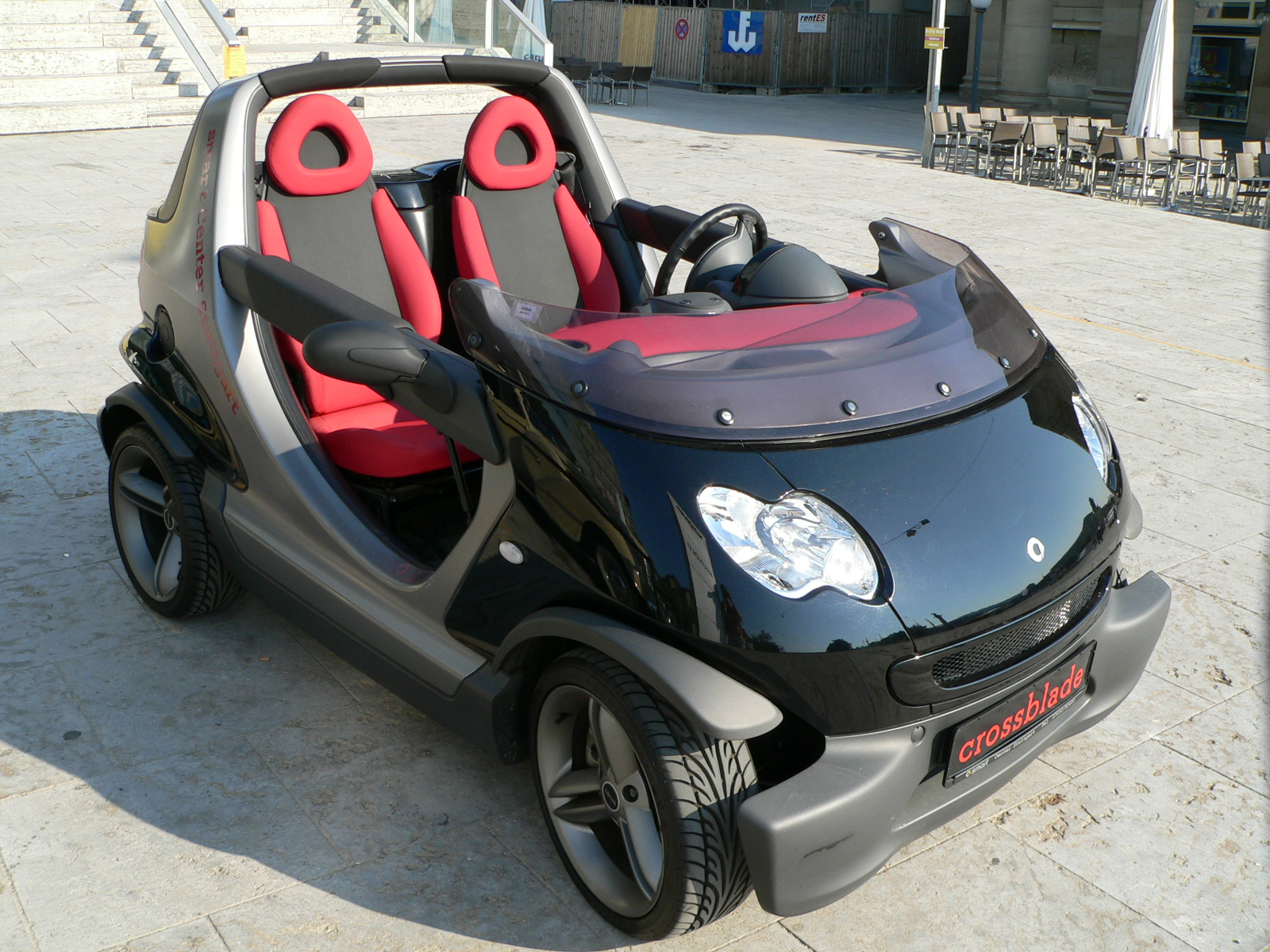
Smart Crossblade

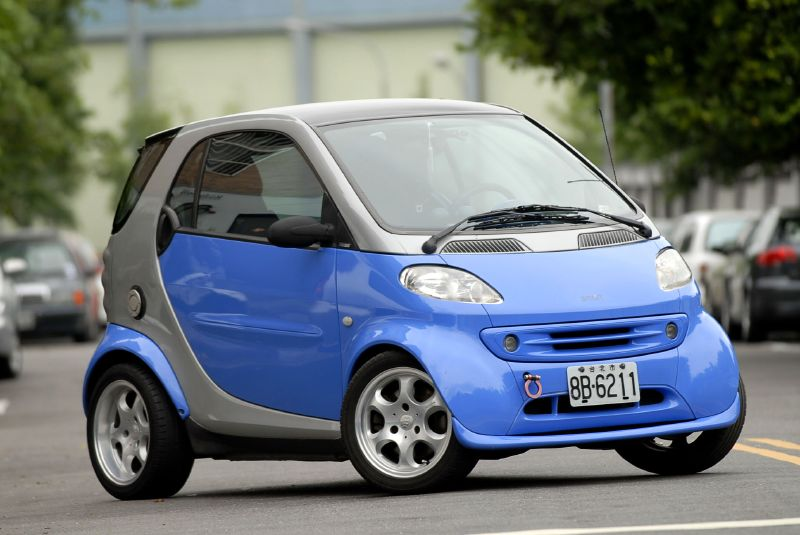
2002 Smart Fortwo BRABUS

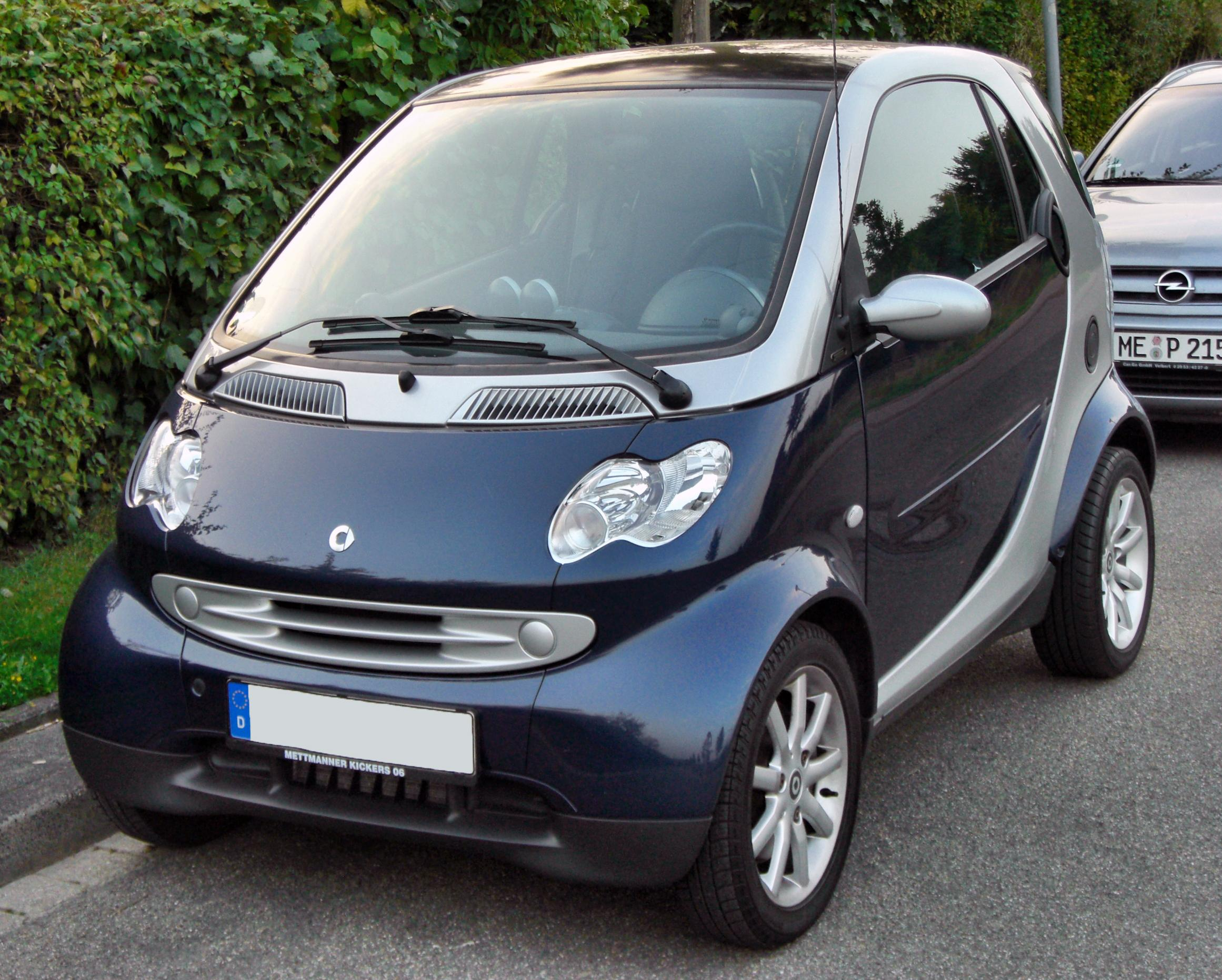
2002 facelift

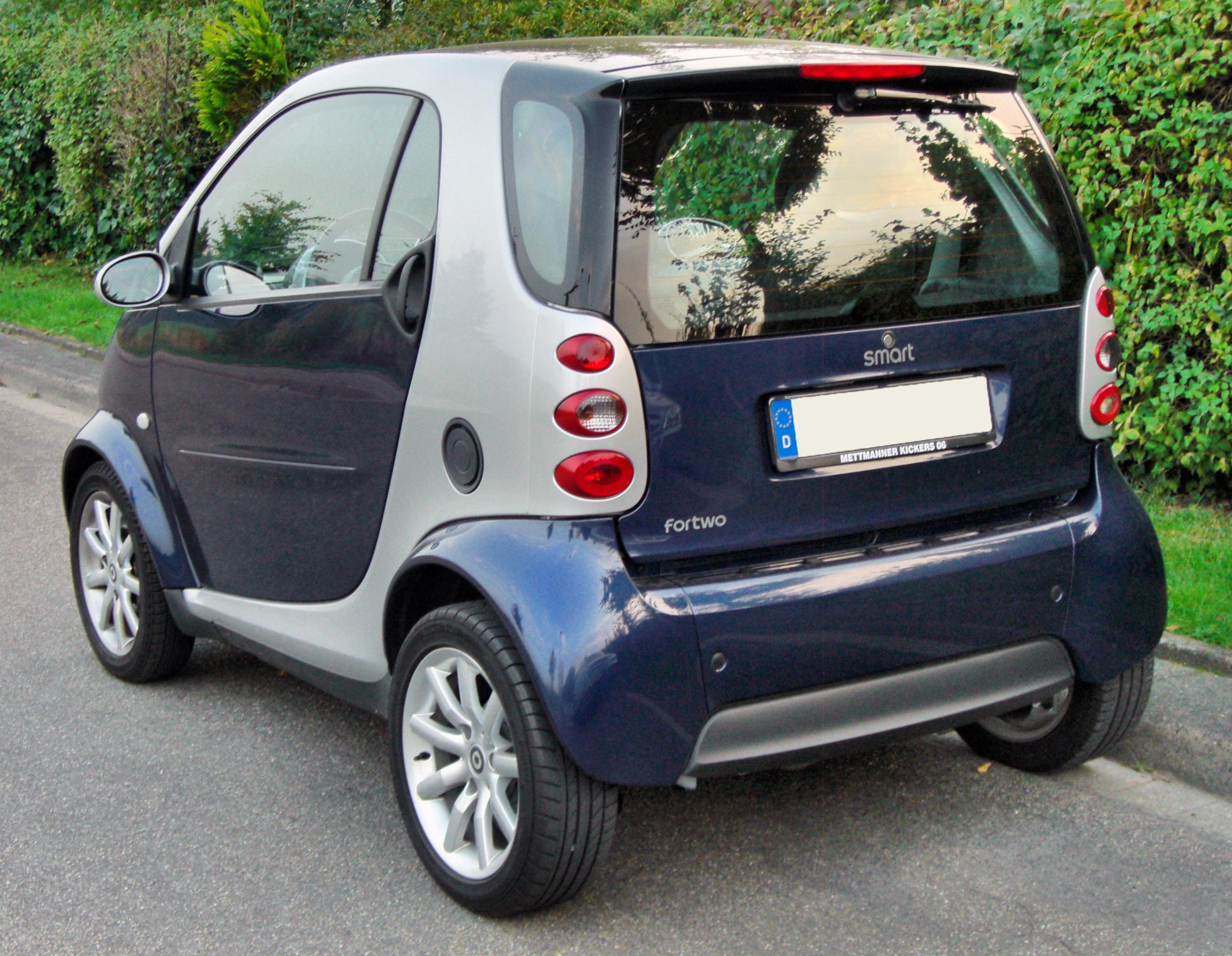
2002 facelift

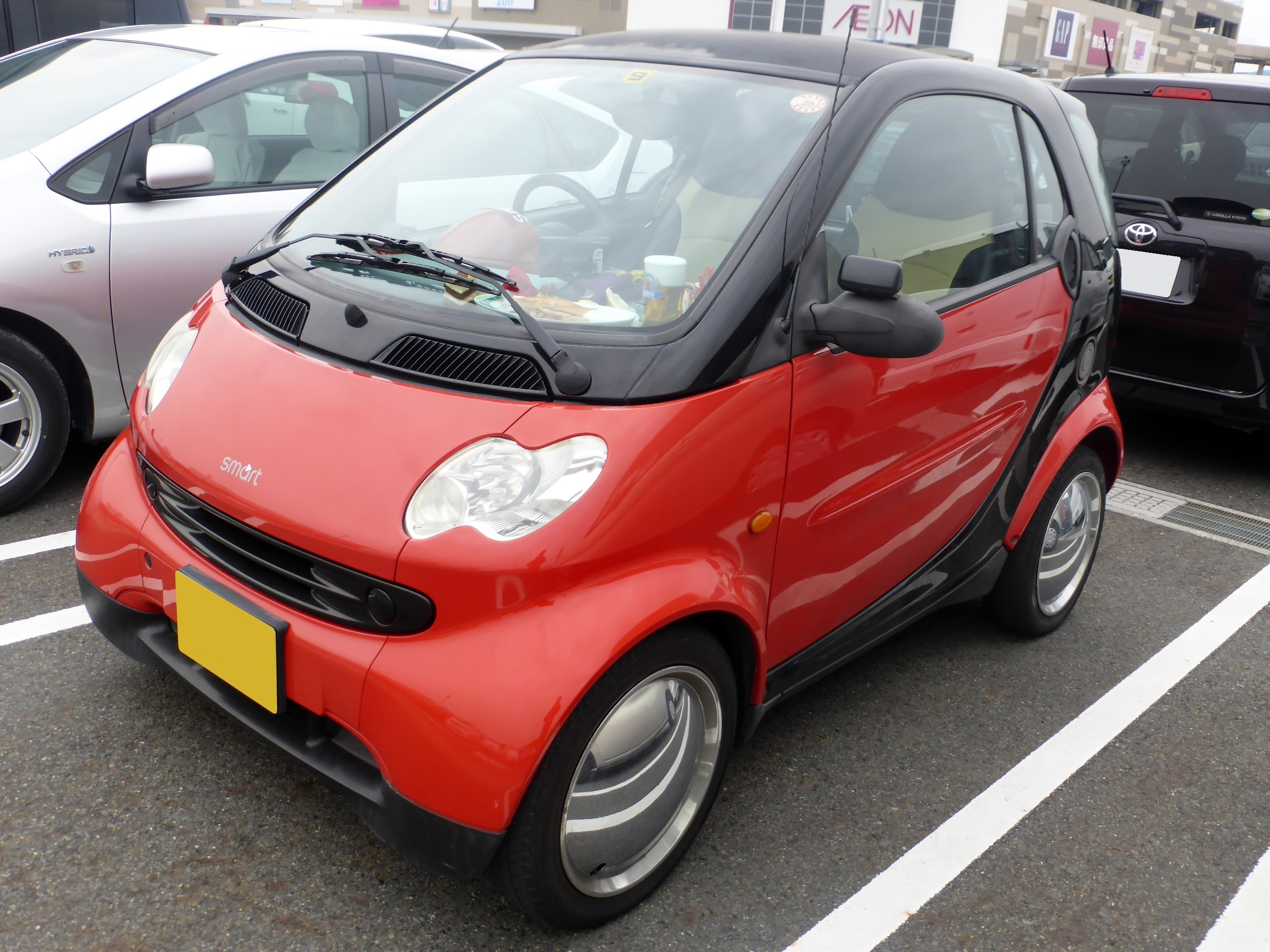
Japanese market Smart K

== Second generation (451 series; 2007) ==
Second generation
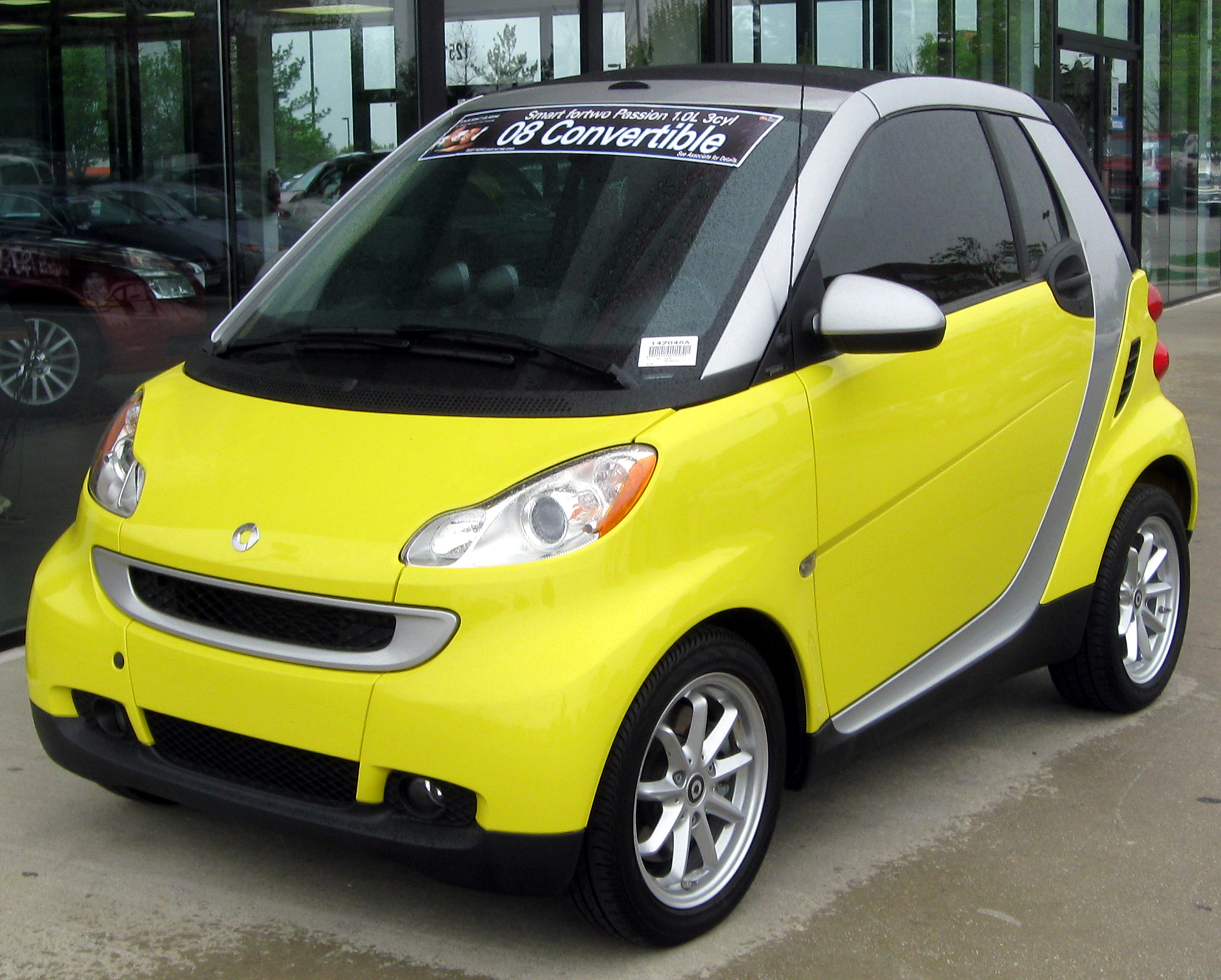

Overview
- Model code: C 451 (fortwo); A 451 (fortwo cabrio)
- Production: November 2006–2014

Body and chassis
- Body style: 3-door hatchback

Powertrain
- Engine: 0.8 L diesel (turbo) I3 (OM660); 1.0 L petrol I3 (3B21); 1.0 L petrol (turbo) I3 (3B21T)
- Transmission: 5-speed automated manual

Dimensions
- Wheelbase: 1,867 mm (73.5 in)
- Length: 2,695 mm (106.1 in)
- Width: 1,559 mm (61.4 in)
- Height: 1,542 mm (60.7 in)
- Kerb weight: 750–795 kg (1,653–1,753 lb) (coupe); 780–820 kg (1,720–1,808 lb) (cabrio)

The second generation, build series 451 (internally: C451, Coupé – A451, Cabrio), was introduced on November 1, 2006—its length increased by 200 mm to 2,690 mm (106.1 in) and offering improved crash performance. The second generation retained the interchangeable plastic body panels as well as the prominent exposed, rigid steel safety cell, which is 50% high-strength steel, hot-dip galvanized and powder-coated—and marketed as Tridion.

The range received a minor interior facelift for the 2011 model year with standard knee airbags, new instrument cluster, more extensive cloth trimming for the top of the instrument panel, circular rather than rectangular outboard dash vents, optional multimedia system with a 6.5" display, and optional surround-sound audio system. For the 2013 model year, all Fortwos received a minor exterior facelift with revised lower facias, front and rear, and a relocated brand emblem located inside rather than above the front grille.

The second generation Fortwo remained the lightest production car on sale in Europe.

=== Engine and fuel economy ===
The 999 cc I3 Mitsubishi 3B2 engine (2007 onwards) is offered in naturally aspirated and turbo versions. German tuner company Brabus, in a joint venture with Smart, has developed a high powered version of the 1.0-litre turbo, producing 102 PS (75 kW; 101 bhp), originally available only in Europe, but now available elsewhere. A small 0.8-litre three-cylinder turbo diesel common rail engine made by Mercedes was available in most European markets.

EU fuel consumption testing for the combined cycle rates the 1.0-litre mhd at 65.7 mpg_{‑imp} (4.30 L/100 km; 54.7 mpg_{‑US}), the turbo at 57.6 mpg_{‑imp} (4.90 L/100 km; 48.0 mpg_{‑US}) and 85.6 mpg_{‑imp} (3.30 L/100 km; 71.3 mpg_{‑US}) for the diesel. The U.S. Environmental Protection Agency (EPA) rates the 1.0-litre at 36 mpg_{‑US} (6.5 L/100 km; 43 mpg_{‑imp}) combined (the EPA does not offer a rating for the diesel engine).

At the 2007 Frankfurt Motor Show, Smart debuted the "micro hybrid drive" (MHD) version of the Fortwo, which was subsequently launched in the UK in 2008. The technology features an automated start-stop system, and a belt-driven starter-generator, which replaces both the starter and alternator. The system generates electricity to charge the battery when the driver is braking, and automatically cuts the engine when the speed drops below 5 mph (8 km/h). Smart claims a fuel efficiency improvement of eight percent from 50 miles per US gallon (4.7 L/100 km; 60 mpg_{‑imp}) to almost 55 miles per US gallon (4.3 L/100 km; 66 mpg_{‑imp}) on the slow NEDC drive cycle—with a reduction in Carbon dioxide emissions from 112 to 103 g/km. This was further improved to 97 g/km in 2010. The mhd version of the Fortwo is not available in the United States or Canada.

Engine	Capacity	Power	Torque	Emissions CO_{2}	Top Speed	0–100 km/h (62 mph)
0.8 cdi (diesel)	799 cc	54 PS (40 kW; 53 bhp)	130 N⋅m (96 lb⋅ft)	86 g/km	84 mph (135 km/h)	16.8 s
1.0 mhd (petrol)	999 cc	71 PS (52 kW; 70 bhp)	92 N⋅m (68 lb⋅ft)	97 g/km (130 g/km in NA)	90 mph (145 km/h)	10.7 s
1.0 turbo (petrol)	999 cc	84 PS (62 kW; 83 bhp)	120 N⋅m (89 lb⋅ft)	115 g/km	90 mph (145 km/h)	9.9 s
1.0 Brabus (petrol)	999 cc	102 PS (75 kW; 101 bhp)	147 N⋅m (108 lb⋅ft)	119 g/km	96 mph (154 km/h)	8.9 s

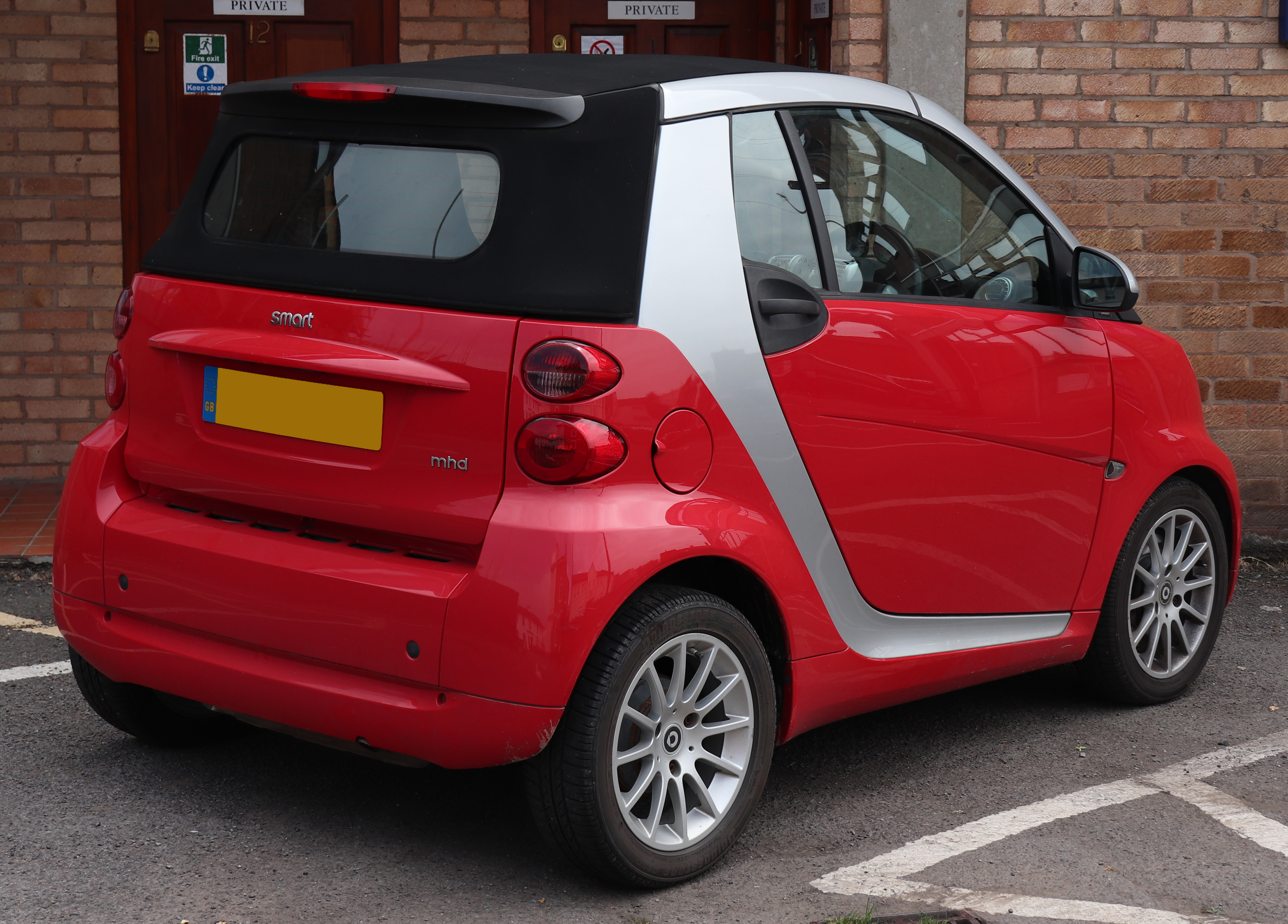
Smart Fortwo Passion cabrio

=== Safety ===
At introduction, the second generation featured front airbags as well as seat-mounted combination head/thorax side airbags along with the Tridion cell, seat belt tensioners, anti-lock brakes, brake force distribution and electronic stability control. In the United States from model year 2012 onward, the Fortwo featured a total of eight dual-stage airbags in the Coupe—front, knee, side (thorax/pelvis) and window curtain—and a total of six dual-stage airbags in the Cabrio model—front, knee, side (thorax/head) dual-stage airbags. As a part of the vehicle's Tridion cell and crash management system, the front crumple zone is maximized by the rear-mounted engine location.

In Insurance Institute for Highway Safety (IIHS) tests, the 2008 Smart Fortwo earned the top overall rating of "Good" in both the front and side crash tests. The Fortwo received the "Good" score in 8 of 11 measured injury categories. Its seat/head restraints earned the second-highest rating of "Acceptable" for protection against whiplash in rear impacts. The IIHS did an offset crash test with a Smart Fortwo and Mercedes-Benz C-Class, which is 40% of one car's driver's side head-on with 40% of another car's driver's side, and the Smart received a "Poor" rating due to the occupants' heads slamming into the steering wheel. Also, there was too much intrusion into the footwell of the Smart Fortwo. The dummy movement was not well controlled. The Smart Fortwo spun 450 degrees in the air upon impact.

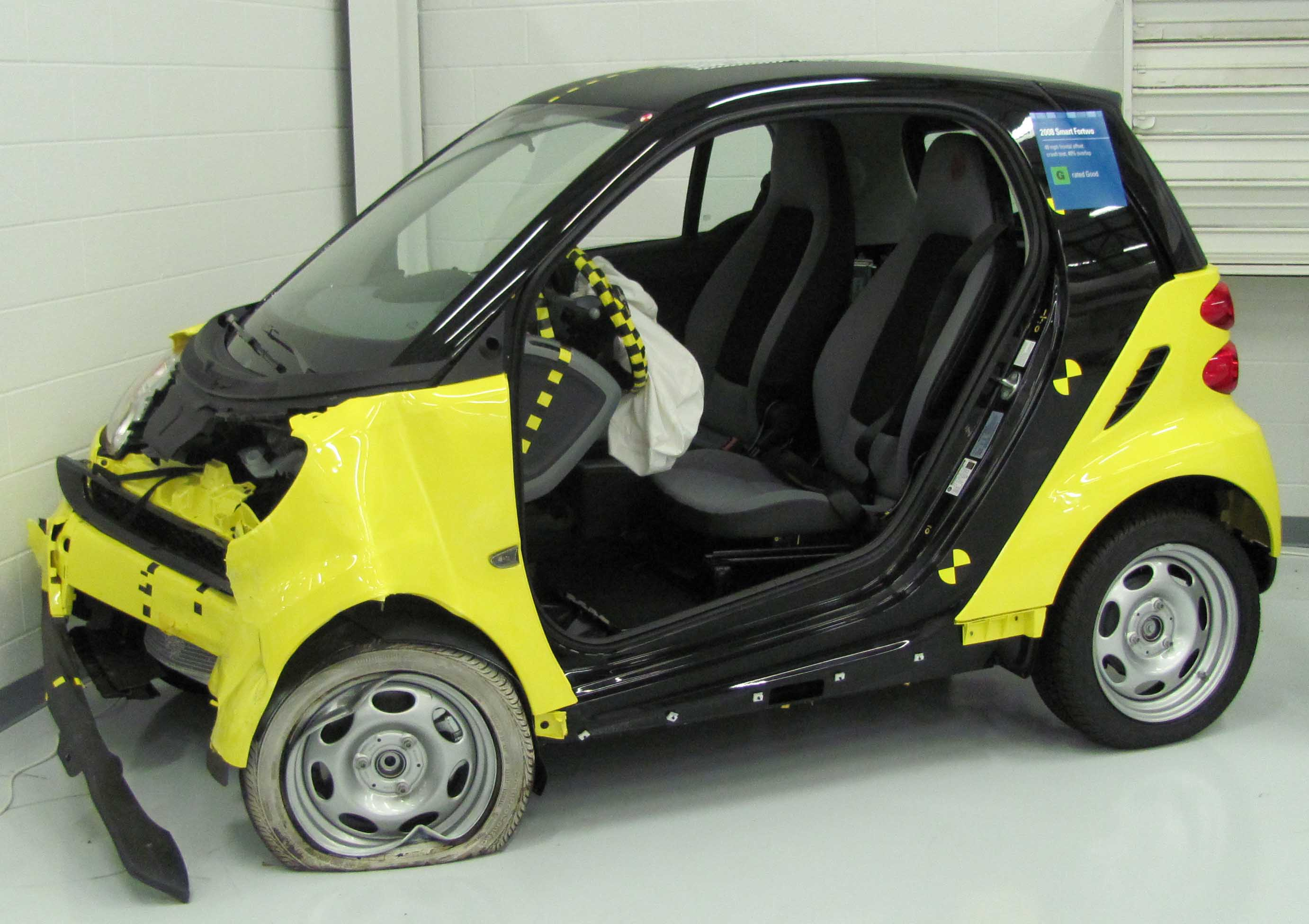
The Fortwo in its stand-alone IIHS crash test

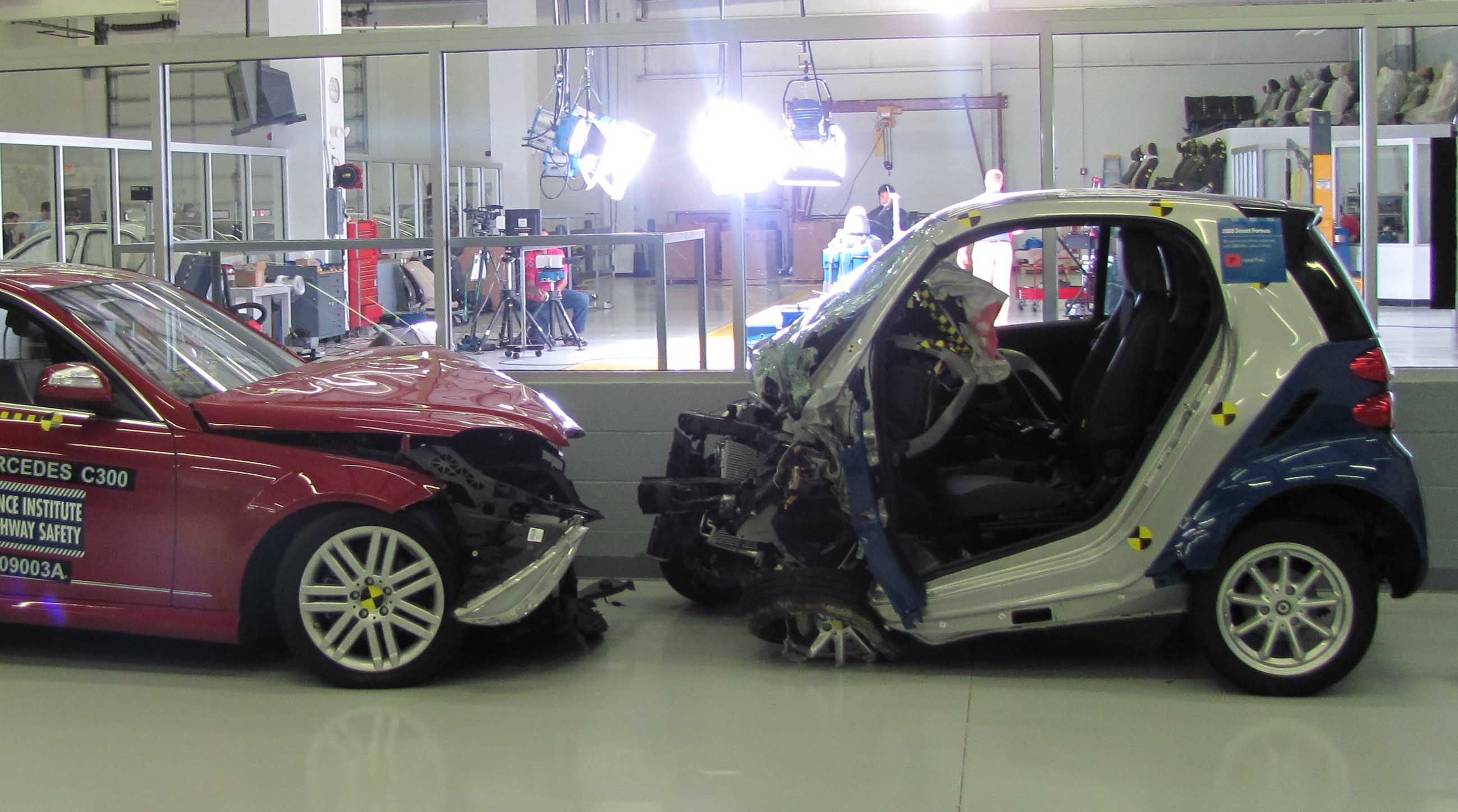
The Fortwo, crashed into a Mercedes-Benz C-Class

U.S. National Highway Traffic Safety Administration (NHTSA) crash test results for the 2008 Smart Fortwo:

- Frontal Driver:
- Frontal Passenger:
- Side Driver: *The driver door unlatched and opened during the side impact crash which increases the likelihood of occupant ejection.
- Rollover:

Euro NCAP crash results:

- Adult Occupant:
- Pedestrian:

=== Smart electric drive ===
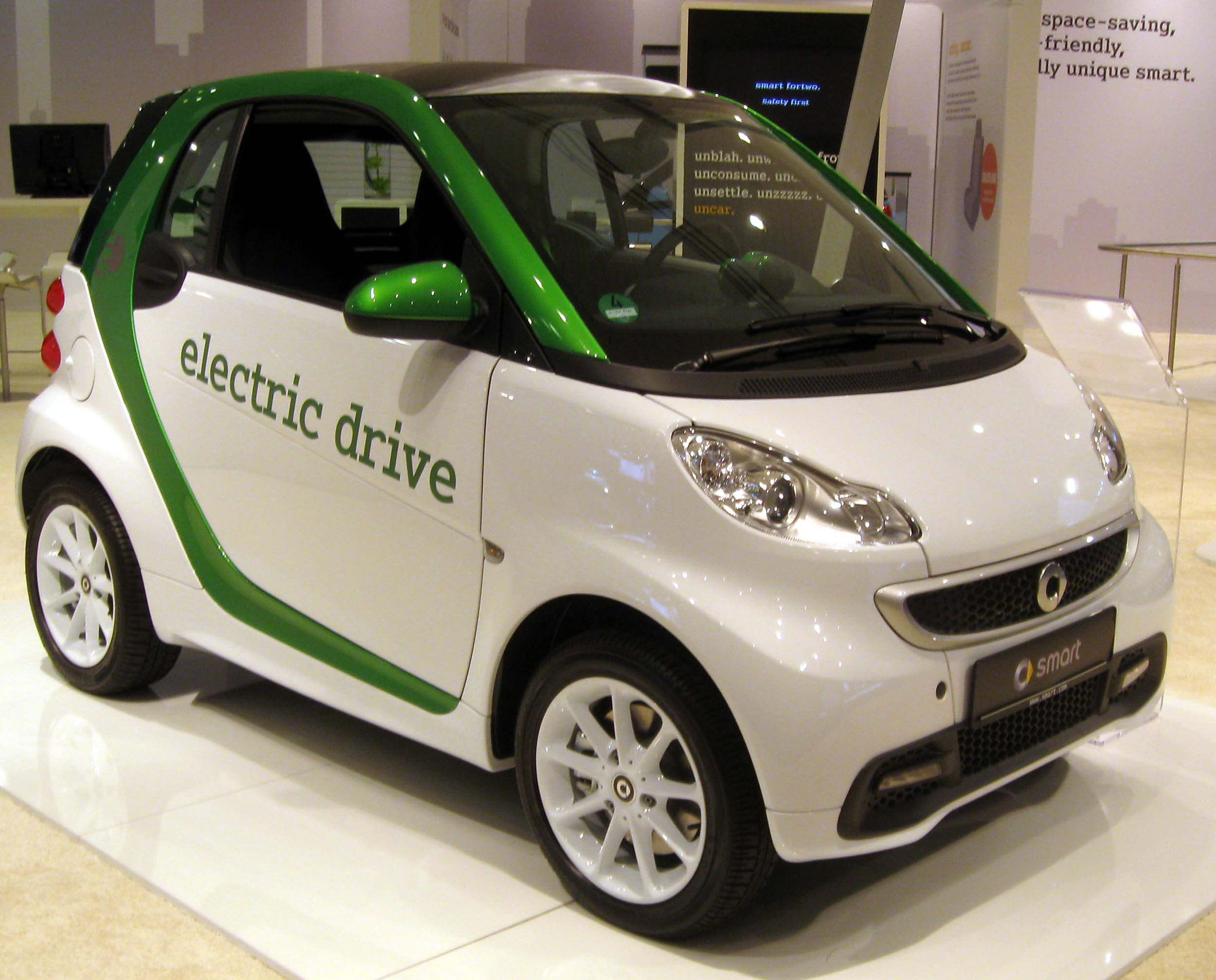
Third generation smart electric drive

An all-electric version of the Fortwo, the Smart Fortwo electric drive, began development in 2006. Field testing began in London with 100 units in 2007, and the second generation, with a total of 2,000 units, was introduced in 2009 and available in 18 markets around the world for leasing or through the Car2Go carsharing service in San Diego and Amsterdam. Production of the second-generation Smart Fortwo electric drive began in November 2009 in Hambach, France. The Smart EDs have a lithium-ion battery provided by Tesla Motors with capacity of 14 kilowatt-hours (50 MJ) initially, 17.6 kilowatt-hours (63 MJ) later. The range of a fully charged battery is up to 135 kilometres (84 miles) under the New European Driving Cycle (NEDC) cycle. The U.S. Environmental Protection Agency's official all-electric range is 63 miles (101 km) and rated the Smart ED with a combined fuel economy of 87 miles per gallon gasoline equivalent (mpg-e) (2.7 L gasoline equivalent/100 km; 104 mpg-imp gasoline equivalent).

The third-generation Smart electric drive was scheduled to be launched in the U.S. and Europe by the second quarter of 2013 and Daimler AG plans to mass-produce the electric car with availability in 30 markets worldwide. The third-generation Smart electric drive was unveiled at the September 2011 Frankfurt Motor Show. Key differences with the second-generation model include a more powerful electric motor, which improves acceleration and top speed, a new lithium-ion battery pack that will allow to increase the range to 140 kilometres (87 mi), and an option for quick-charge will be available.

=== Brabus ===
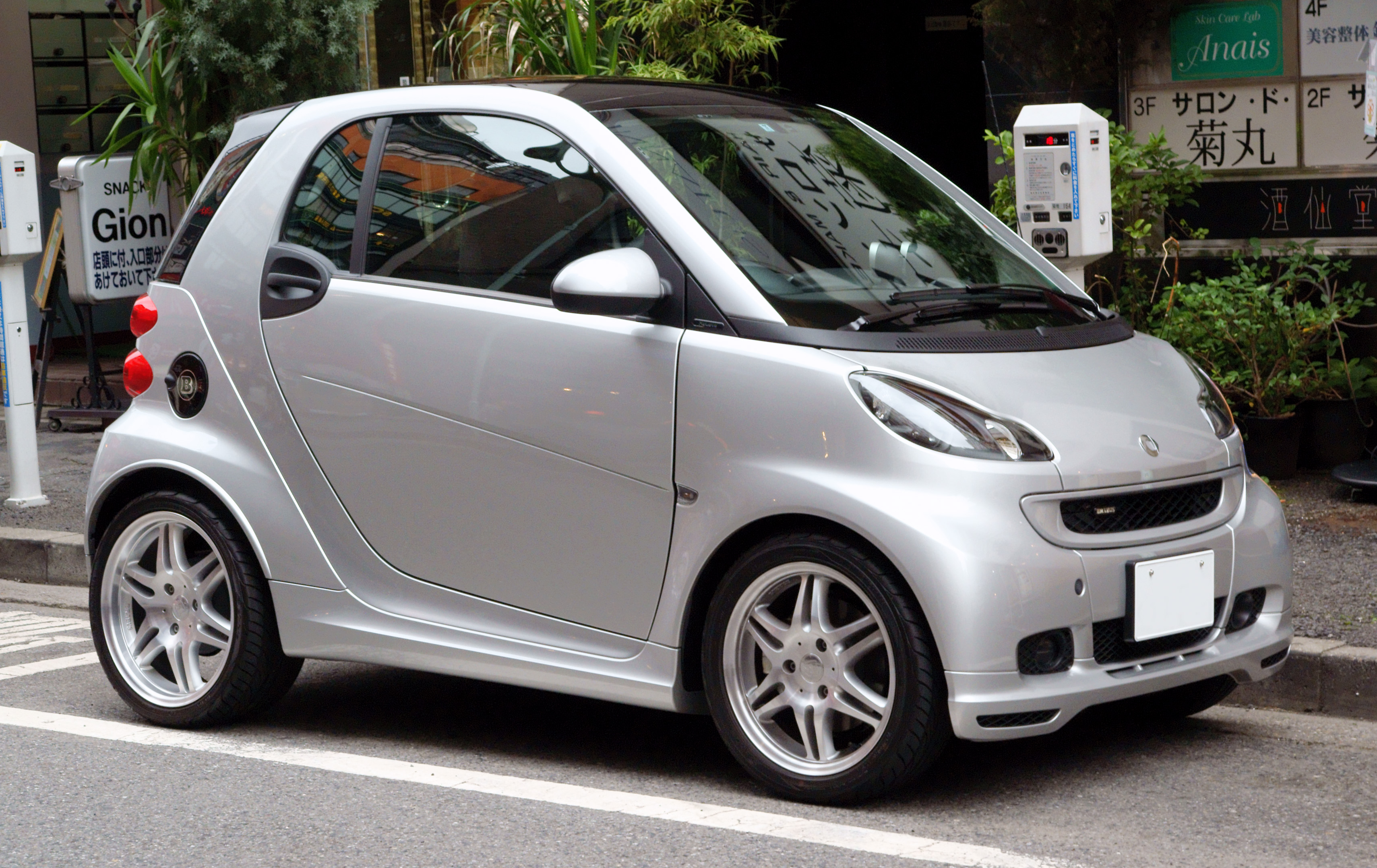
2008 Fortwo Brabus

A sport package for the Fortwo made by Brabus (styled BRABUS) includes a sport exhaust with dual center tips, sport suspension, 16-inch front and 17-inch rear wheels, power steering and various Brabus visual cues. An originally planned turbocharged engine was not included. The Brabus package is available in cabriolet or coupe body styles, the latter equipped with a panoramic roof (made of glass for the first generation and polycarbonate for the second), and available in metallic silver or deep black.

=== Safety ===
ANCAP test results* Smart Fortwo variant(s) as tested (2008)
Test	Score
Overall	3 /5 stars
Frontal offset	12.85/16
Side impact	13.98/16
Pole	Not assessed
Seat belt reminders	1/3
Whiplash protection	Not assessed
Pedestrian protection	Marginal
Electronic stability control	Standard

=== Gallery ===
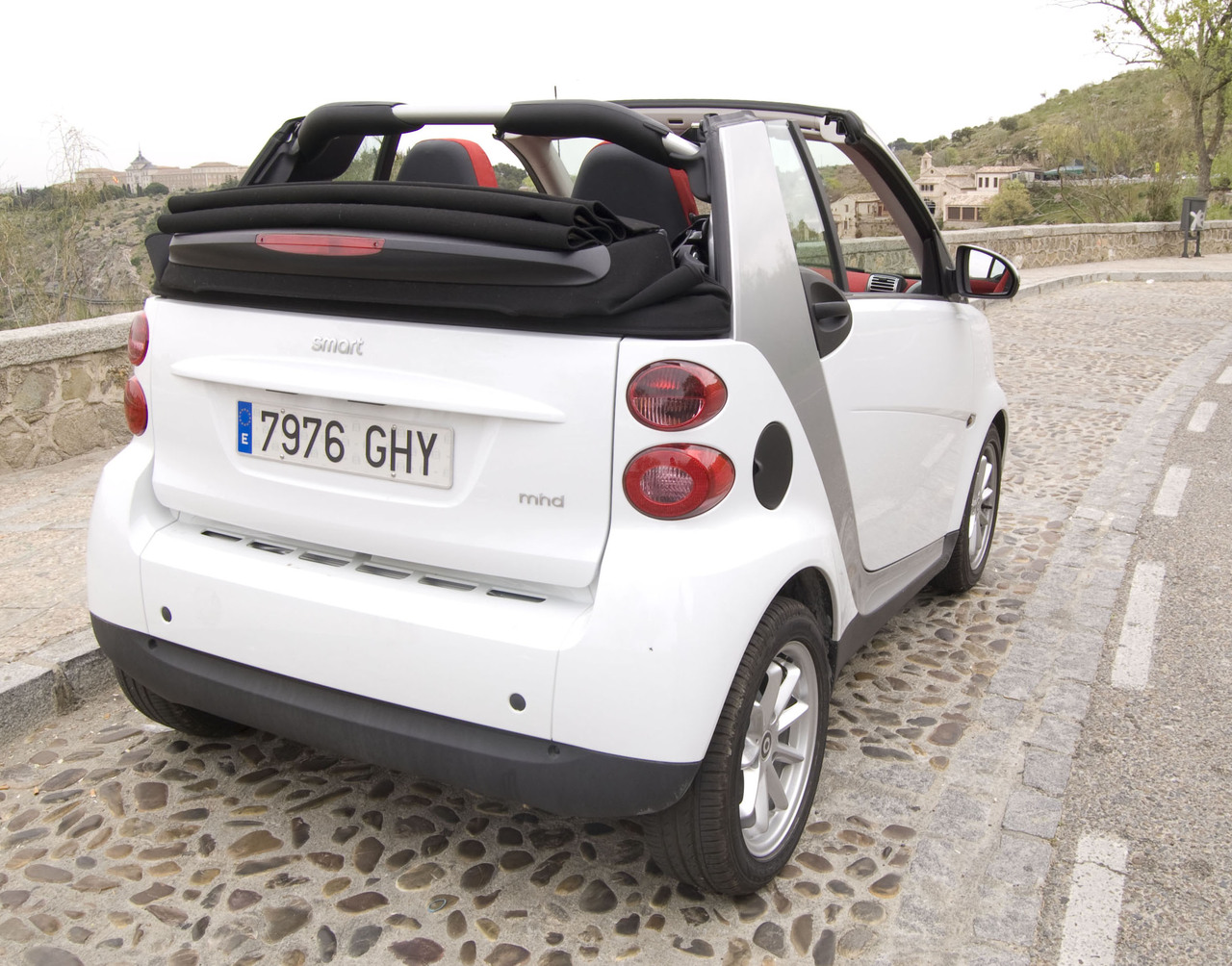
Cabrio

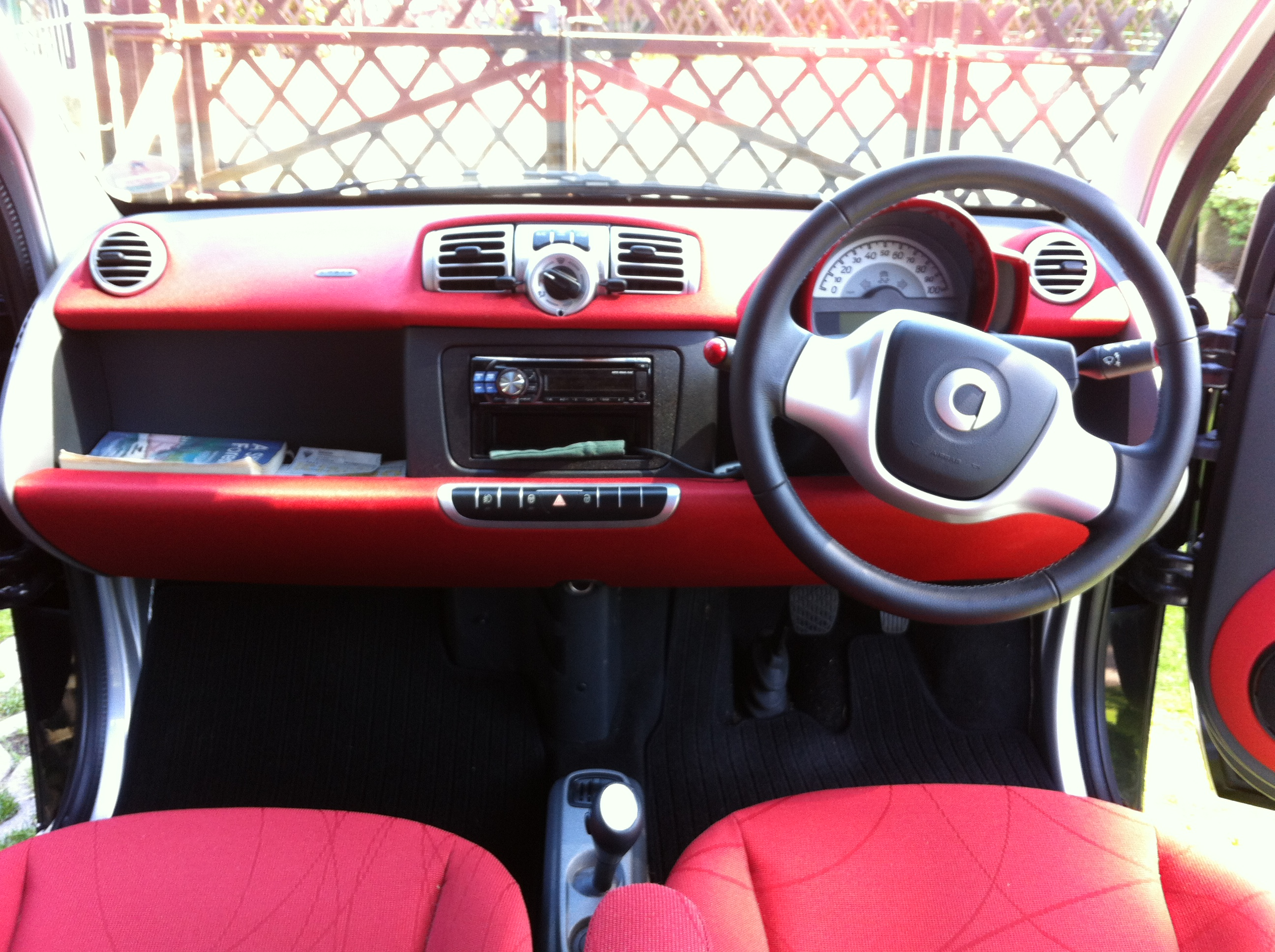
Interior

== Third generation (453 series; 2014) ==
Smart Fortwo
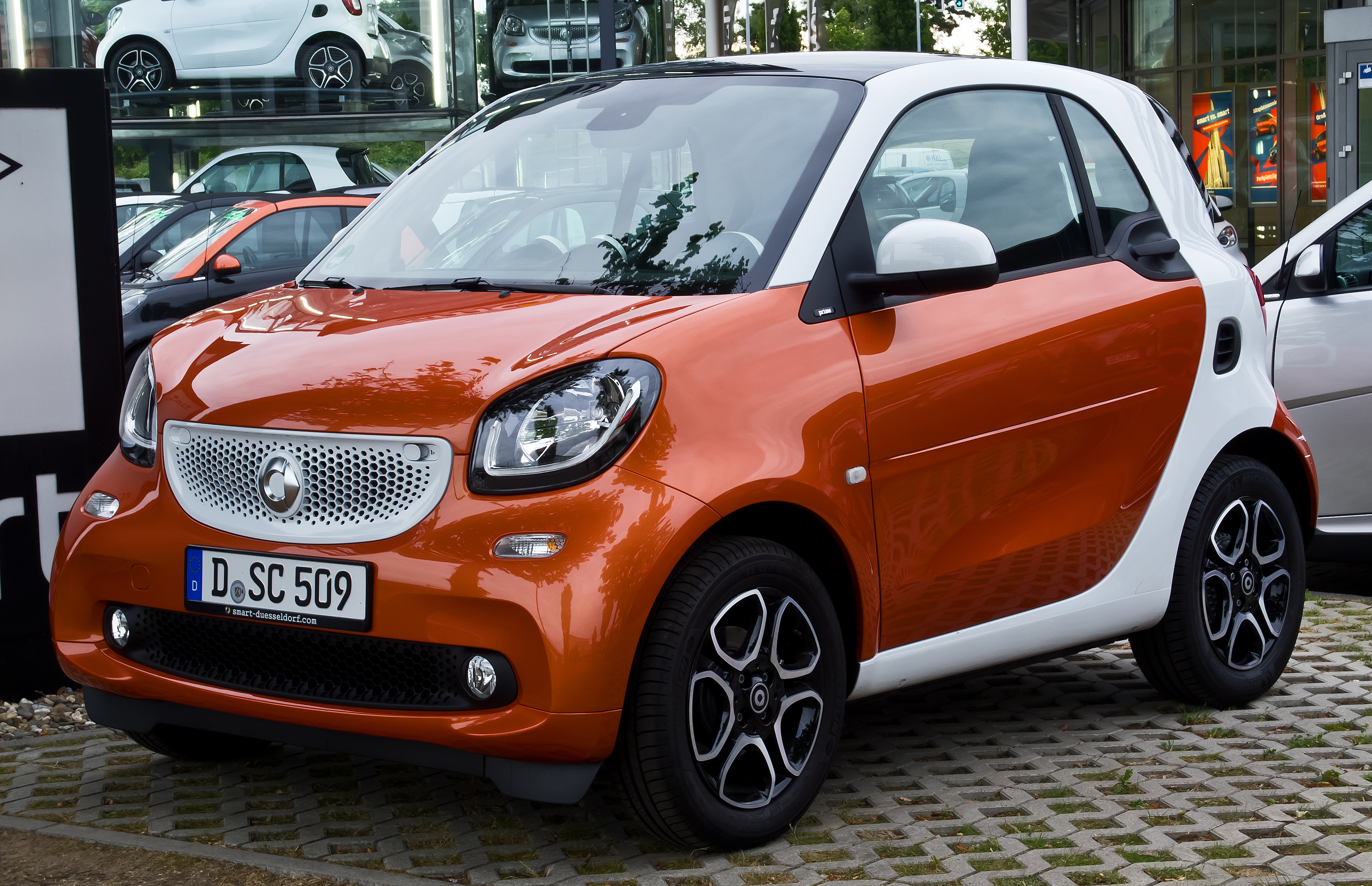

Overview
- Model code: C 453 (fortwo); A 453 (fortwo cabrio)
- Also called: smart EQ fortwo (2017–2024)
- Production: 2014–2019; 2017–2024 (EQ Fortwo)
- Designer: Emiel Burki and Michael Gebhardt under Kai Sieber

Body and chassis
- Body style: 3-door hatchback 2-door cabriolet
- Related: (W 543 Smart Forfour): Smart Forfour; (3rd Generation Twingo) Renault Twingo

Powertrain
- Engine: 0.9 L M281 turbo I3; 1.0 L M281 petrol I3; 66 kW synchronous electric motor
- Transmission: 5-speed manual 6-speed DCT; Single-speed direct drive

Dimensions
- Wheelbase: 1,873 mm (73.7 in)
- Length: 2,695 mm (106.1 in)
- Width: 1,663 mm (65.5 in)
- Height: 1,555 mm (61.2 in)
- Kerb weight: 880 kg (1,940 lb)

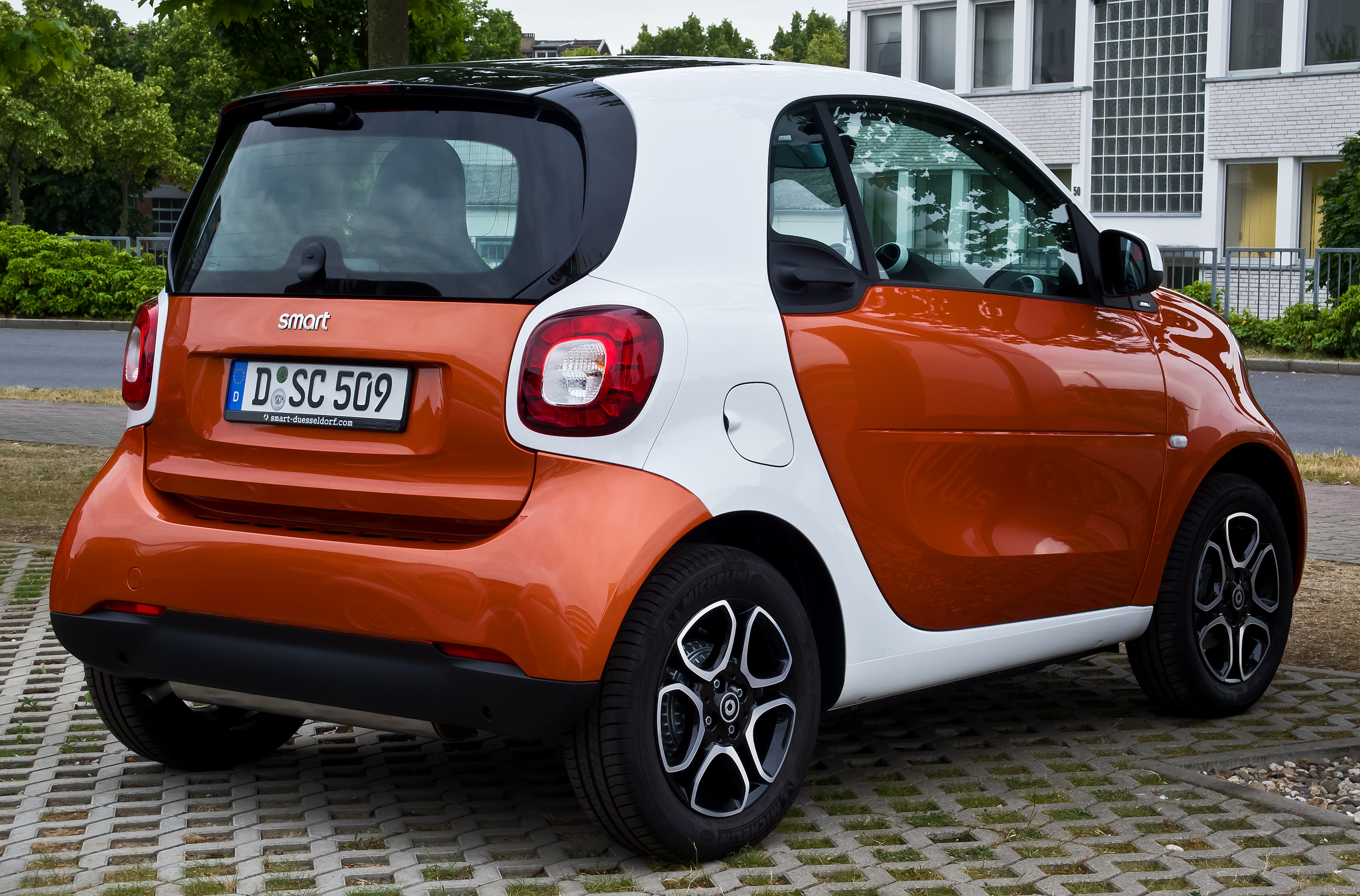
Rear end of third generation Fortwo

Designed under the direction of Kai Sieber with designer Michael Gebhardt, the third generation launched on July 16, 2014, having been jointly developed with Renault. The third generation was available as the 3-door 2-seater (internally designated as the C453) and 5-door 4-seater (internally designated the W453), marketed as the Fortwo and Forfour, respectively. Motor Trend reported prior to its introduction that the third generation ForFour was to share approximately 70% of its parts with the third generation Renault Twingo, itself only offered as a four-door, four-seater.

At time of launch, the third generation Fortwo was powered by either of two 3-cylinder engines: a 1.0-litre engine producing 71 bhp and 70 lb ft of torque, or a turbocharged 0.9-litre (898 cc) 89 bhp engine with 100 lb ft of torque. A lower-powered 59 bhp engine was planned to follow later. All versions came with either a manual five-speed gearbox or "twinamic" dual-clutch automatic transmission instead of the previous 'Softouch' system. During development, Daimler had consulted with Ford to learn about their Ecoboost 1.0-litre turbo-charged inline 3-cylinder engine, in turn sharing information about its own Euro6 stratified lean-burn gasoline engines.

Prior to its debut, Smart CEO Annette Winkler reported the new C453 generation car would share its 2.69 metre length with the previous W451 as well as its trademark hemispherical steel safety cell, marketed as the Tridion cell. The ForTwo continued to be assembled at Smartville, and the ForFour was manufactured alongside the Renault Twingo 3 in Novo Mesto, Slovenia.

Smartville, where the W450 and W451 have been manufactured, underwent a 200 million euro upgrade beginning in mid-2013, in preparation for the C453 Fortwo, and was ultimately sold to Ineos.

=== Cabriolet (A453) (2016–2024) ===
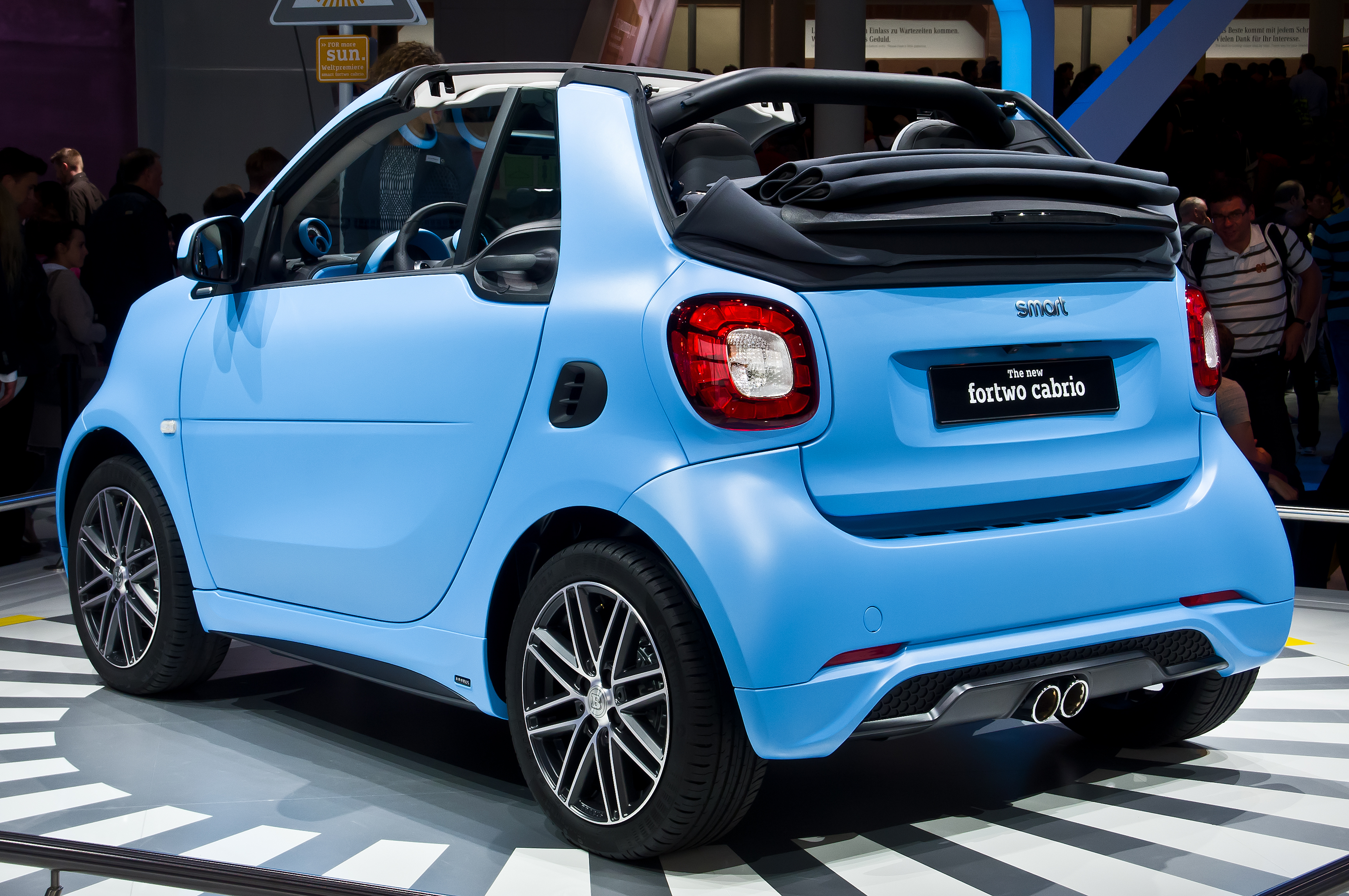
Third generation Fortwo Cabrio

In 2015, Smart announced a cabriolet version of the Smart Fortwo at the 2015 Frankfurt Motor Show. The smart fortwo cabrio launched globally in 2016. Cabrio models received additional safety cell reinforcements to compensate for the roof openings, including torsional bulkheads beneath the car, a crossbar behind the passenger seats (sometimes referred to as a basket handle), and additional reinforcement of the A-pillars. Smart claims the standard power soft top will open or close in 12 seconds, and can be operated at any speed. At market launch, 5 soft top colors were offered; black, red, grey, beige and brown. Grey, beige and brown tops were marketed as BRABUS tailor made soft tops.

The smart fortwo cabrio featured removable roof bars that stow into an integrated storage space in the fortwo's rear tailgate. When removed, these roof bars allowed for an open-air driving experience. The fortwo's roof bars were not integrated into the safety structure of the car, and only housed the guide rails for the soft top to close.

=== Smart EQ rebrand (2018–2024) ===
Smart announced in March 2018 that electric versions of the smart fortwo would be branded as the smart EQ fortwo. This change was to further align with the upcoming Mercedes EQ brand in which all Mercedes-Benz produced electric vehicles would receive EQ branding. The rebranding occurred for global March 2018 production, or Model Year 2018.5 in the United States & Canada. Both the coupe and cabrio electric drive models lost the electric drive badges front and rear and received smart EQ fortwo badges in their place, and received updated graphics in the optional smart Media-System.

=== Facelift (2019–2024) ===
In the fourth quarter of 2019, a facelift model was announced to be available with electric drive beginning in 2020. Tech specs remained the same.

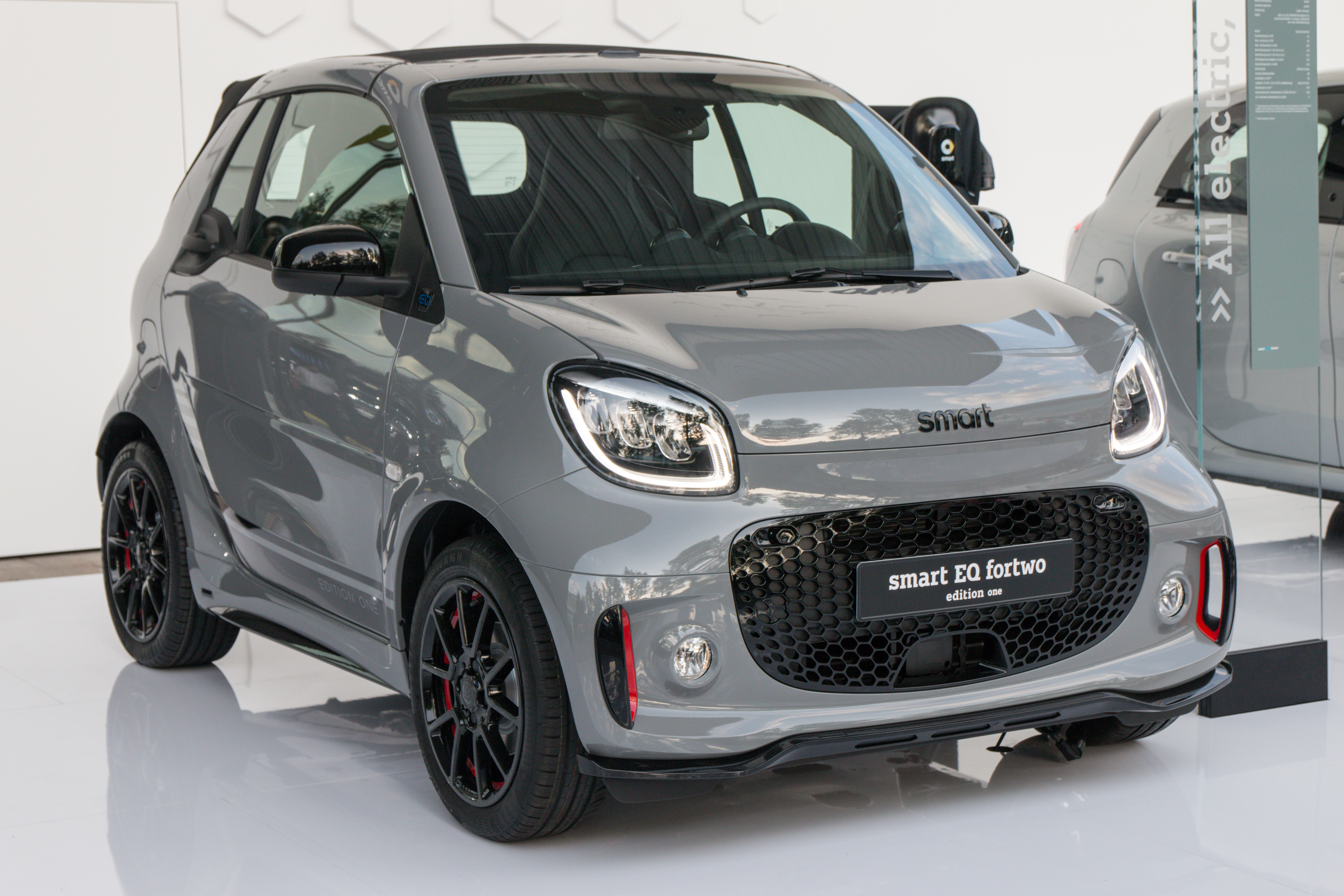
Smart EQ Fortwo Cabrio (facelift)

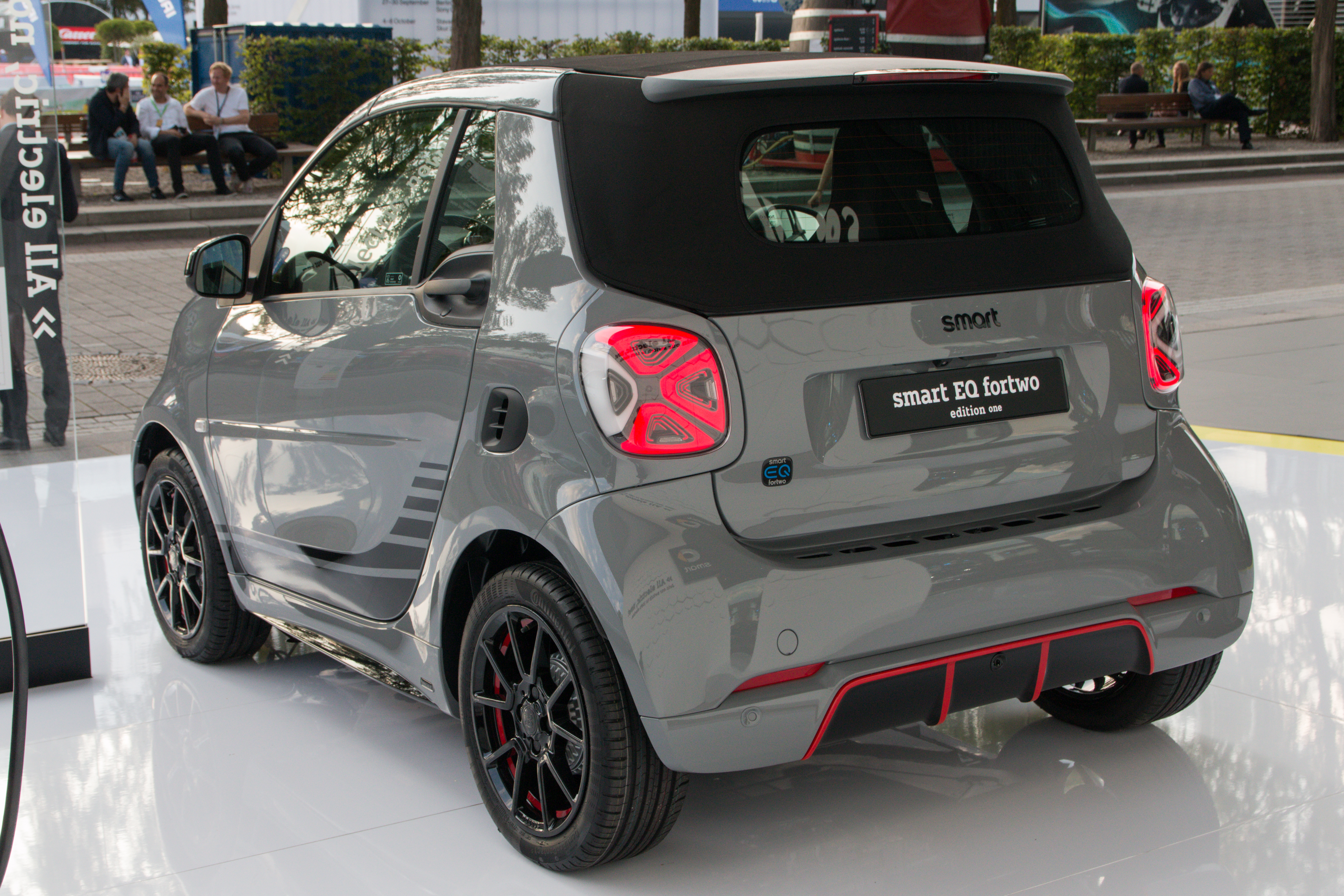
Smart EQ Fortwo Cabrio (rear view)

=== Gallery ===
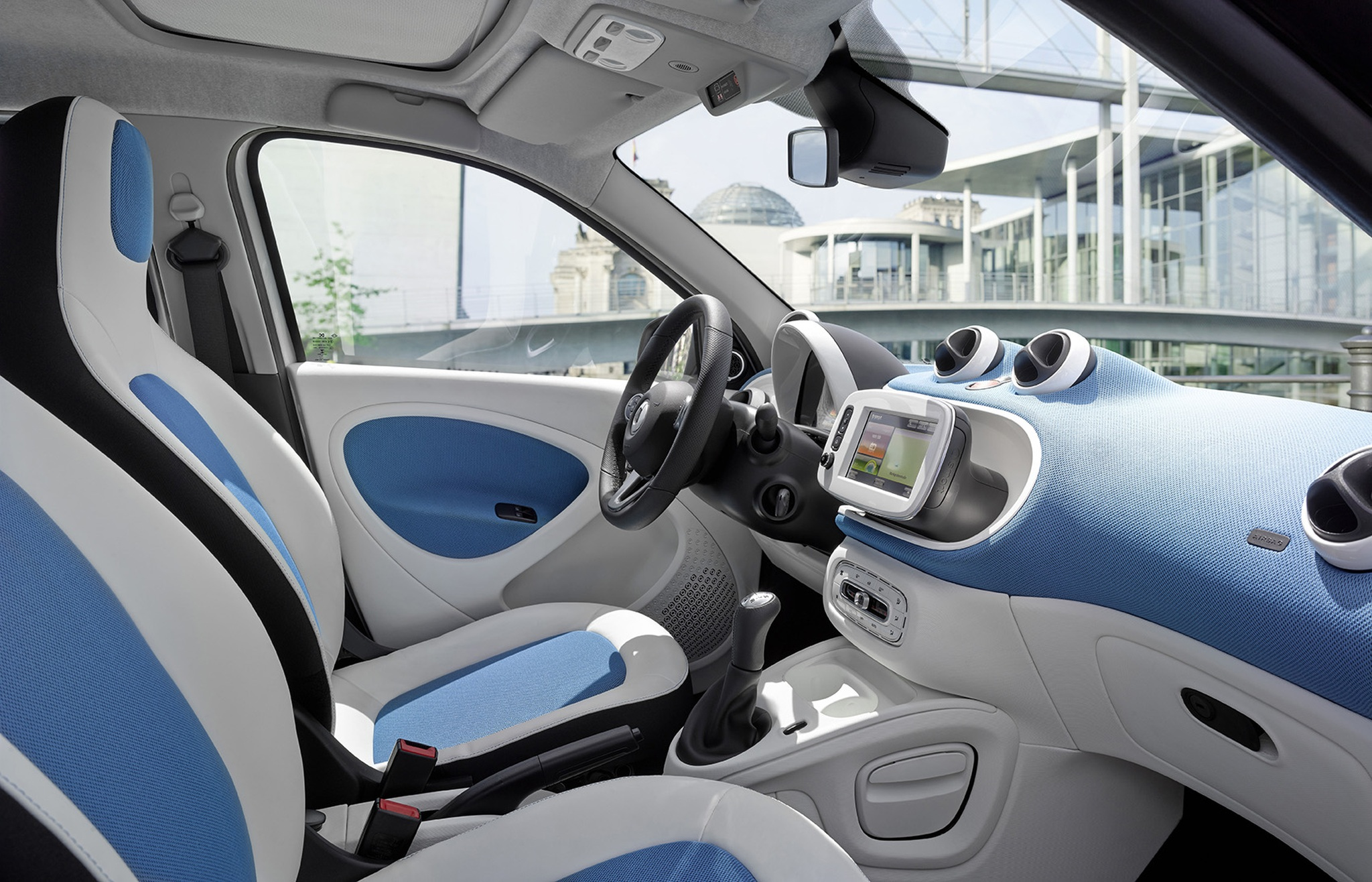
Interior

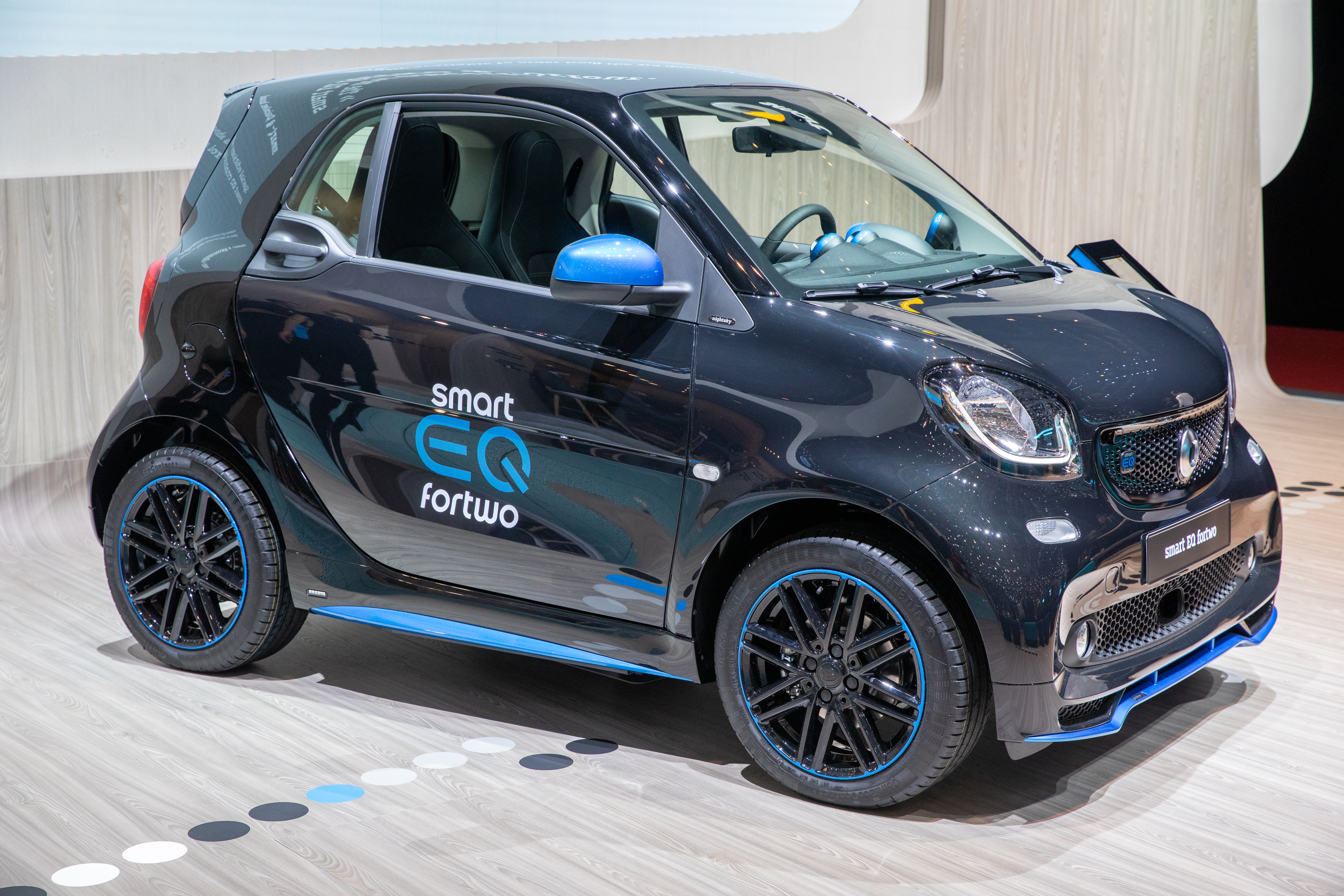
Smart EQ Fortwo at Geneva International Motor Show 2018

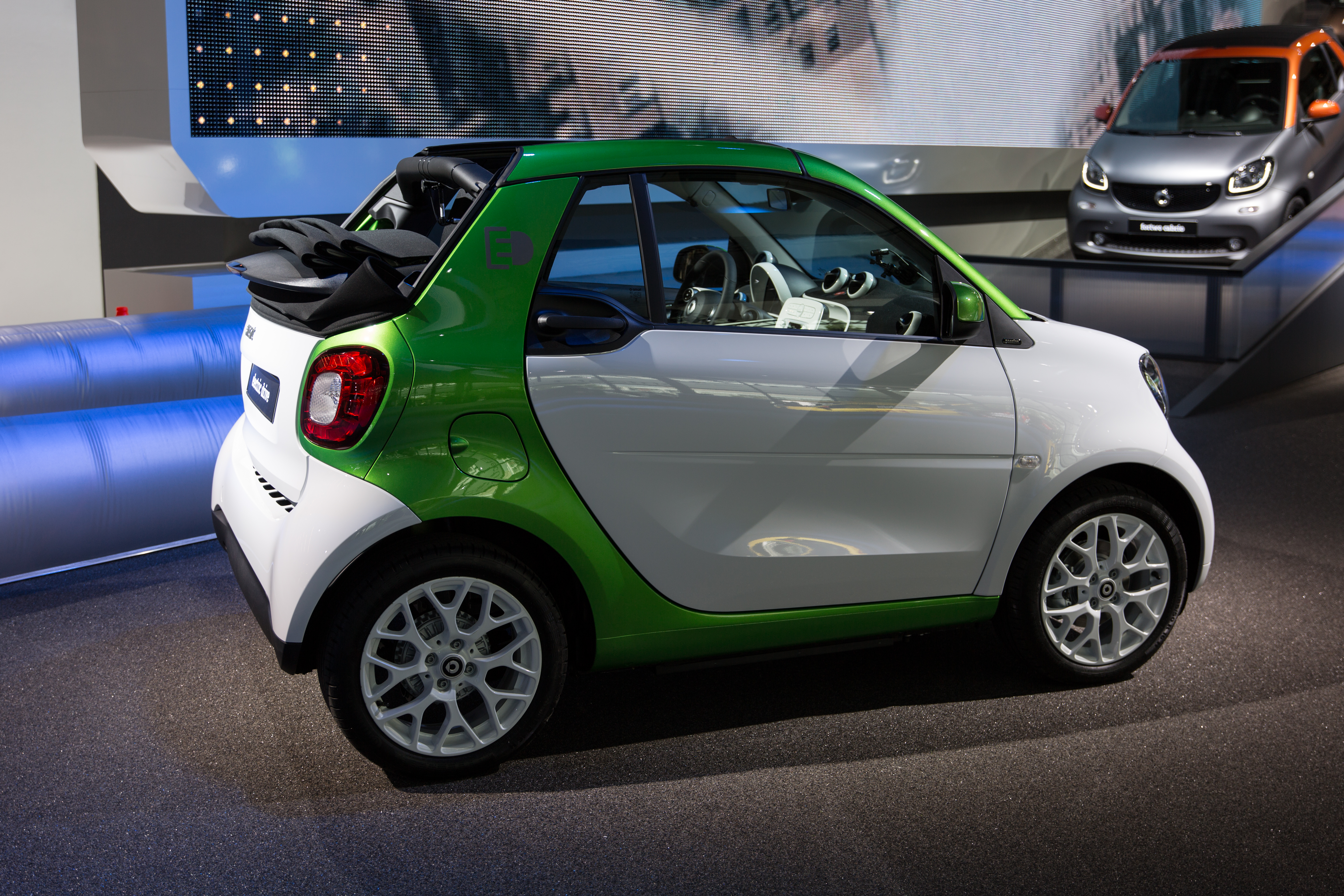
Fortwo Cabrio Electric Drive (now Smart EQ Fortwo Cabrio)

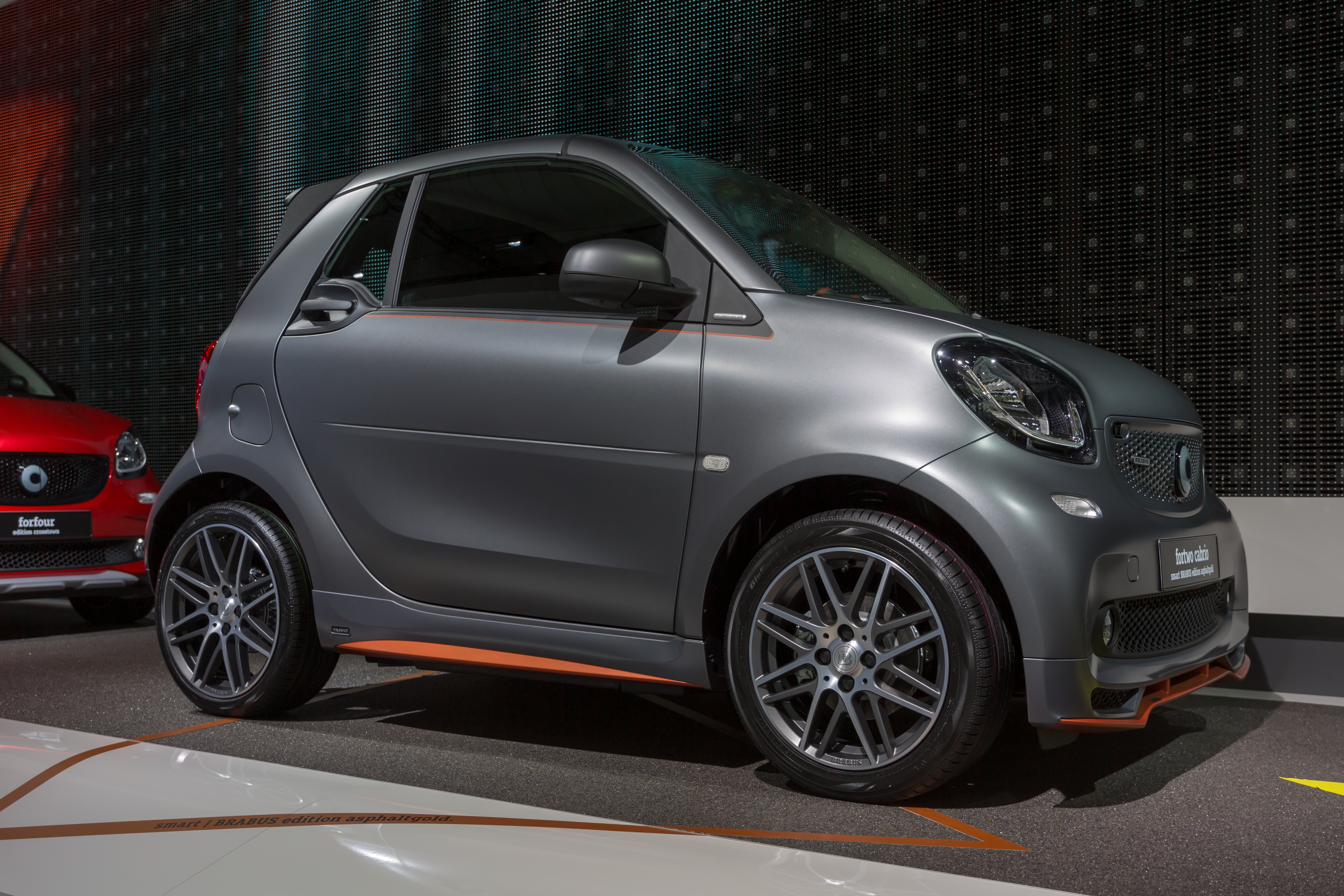
Smart Fortwo cabrio Brabus

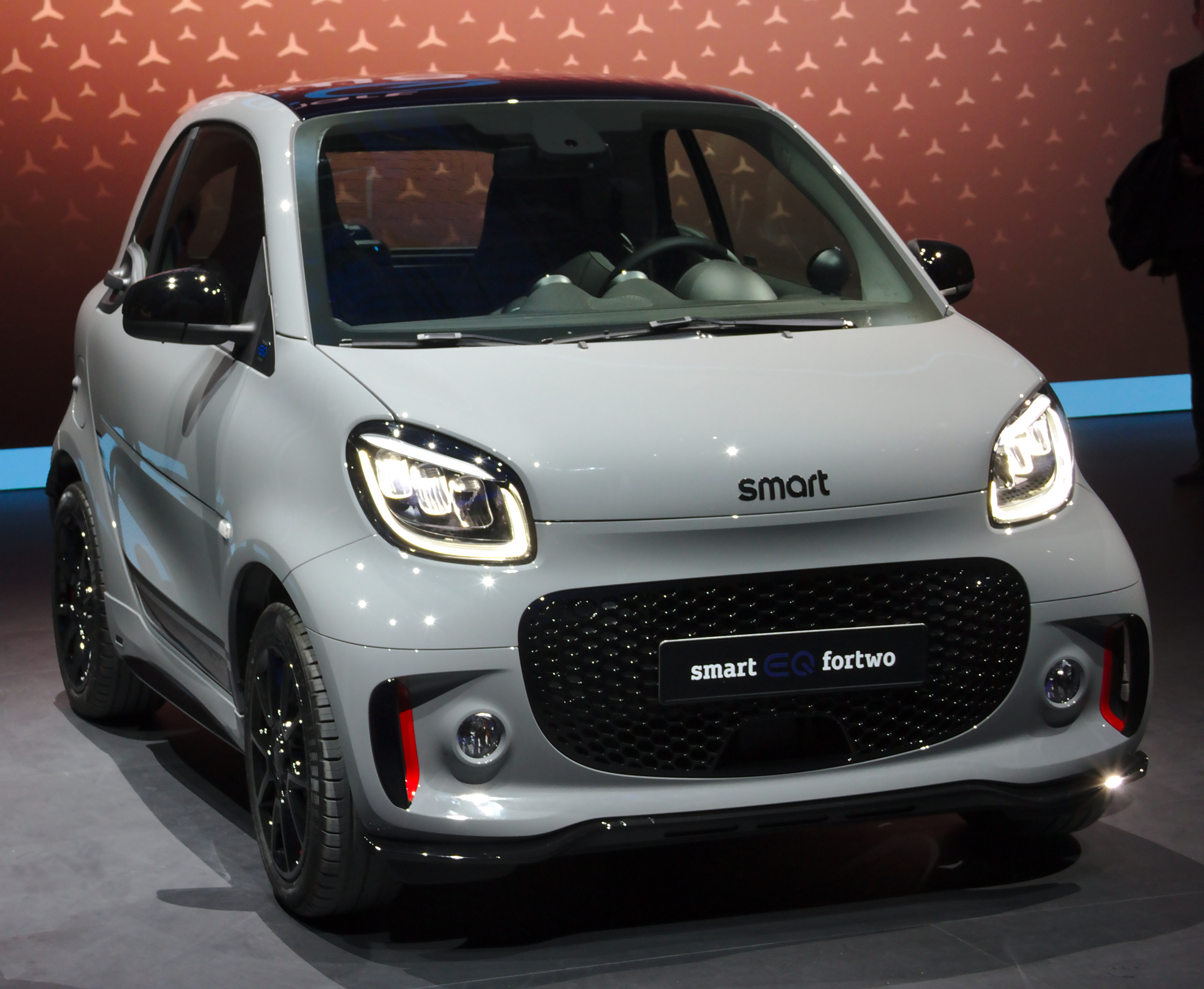
Smart EQ Fortwo at IAA 2019

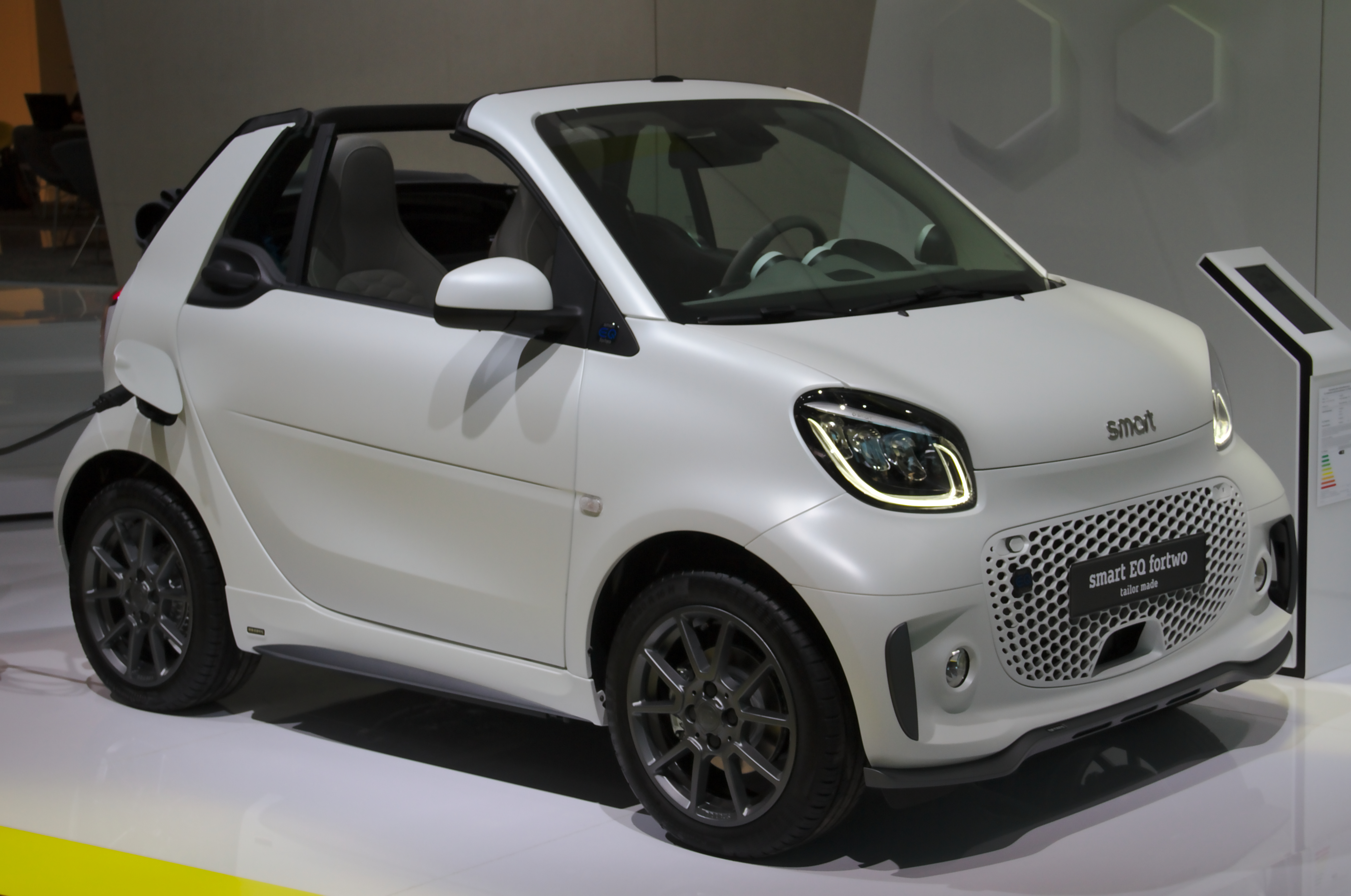
Smart EQ Fortwo Cabrio at IAA 2019

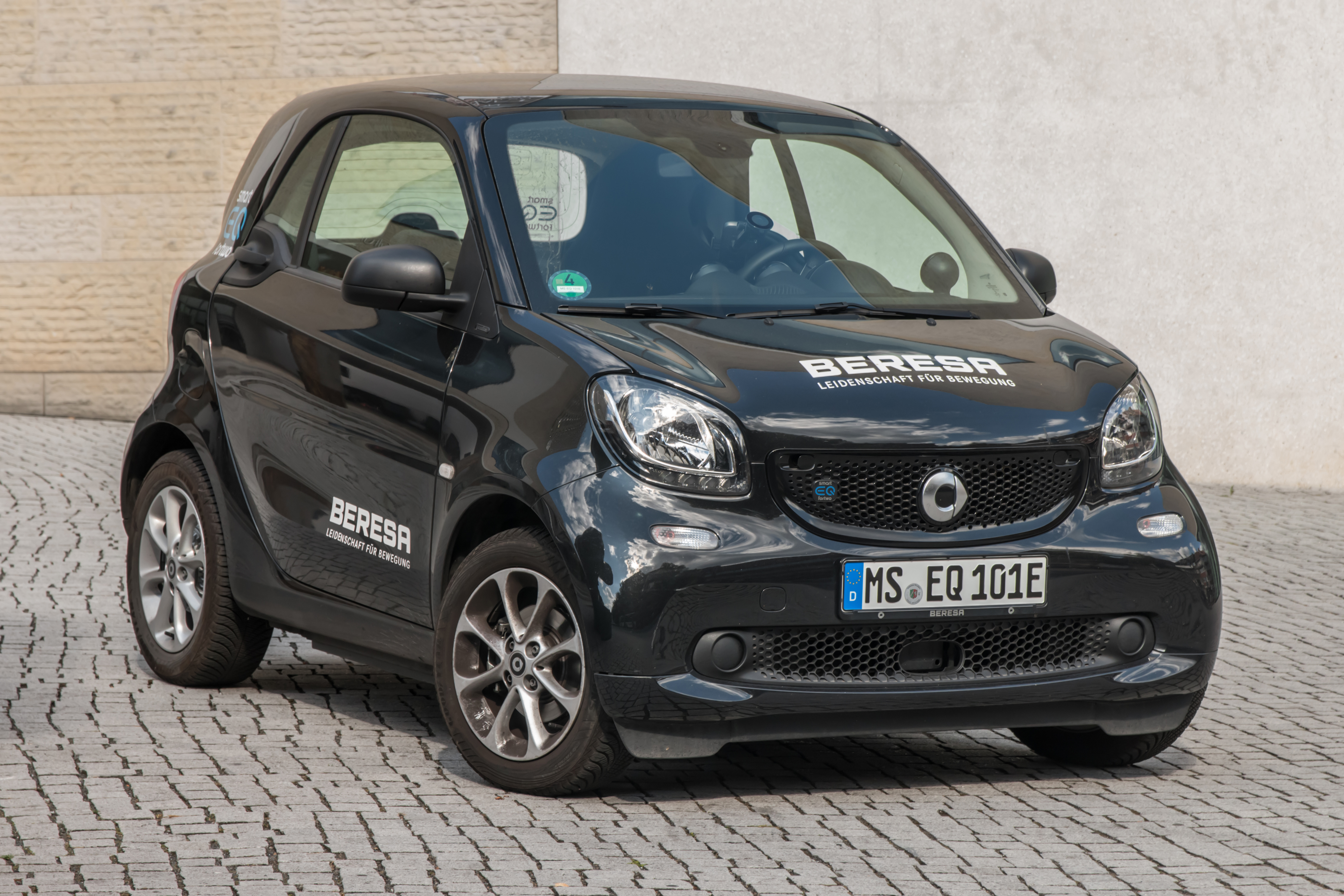
Smart EQ Fortwo

== International markets ==
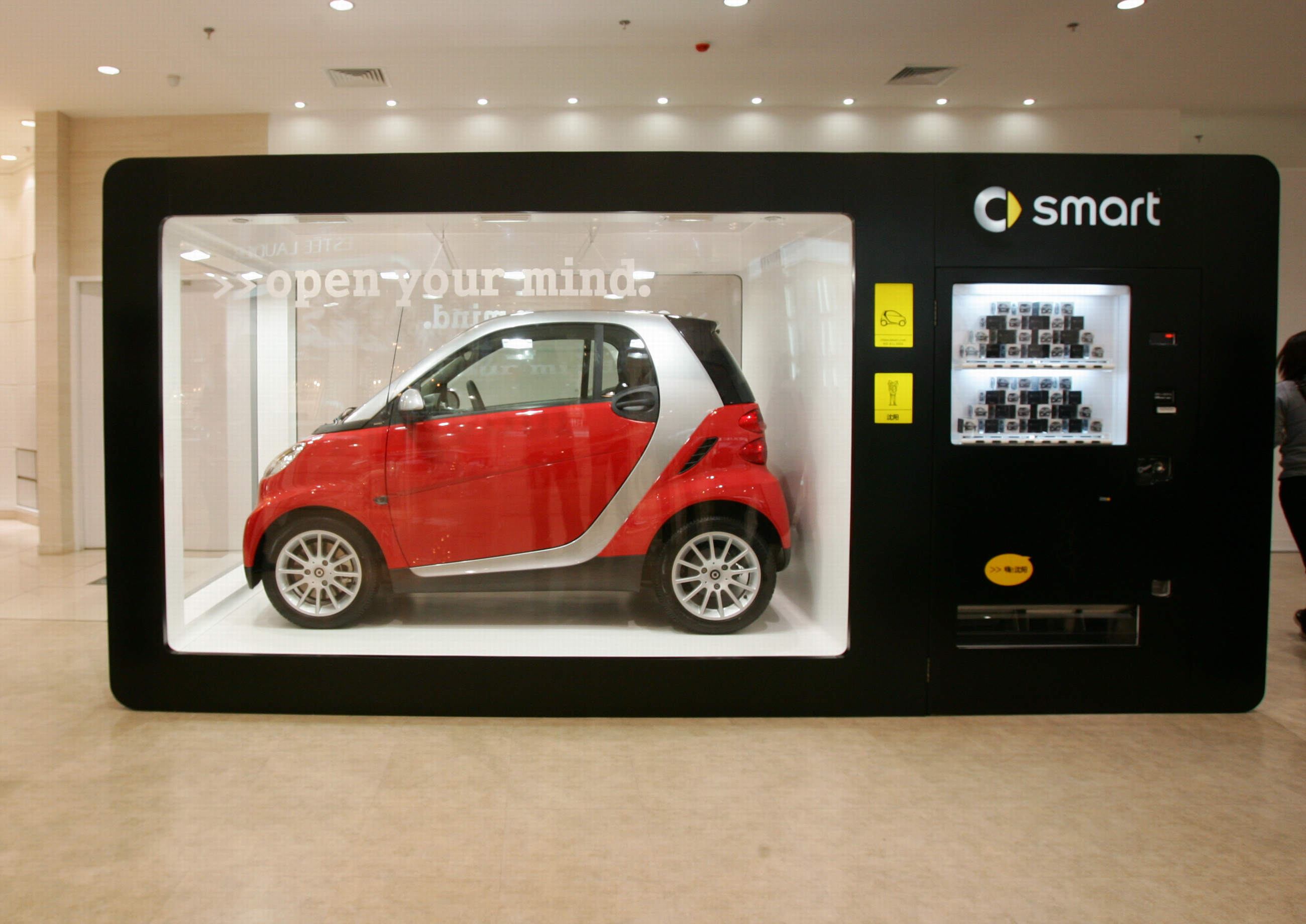
The Smart "vending machine" in Shenyang, China

The vehicle was initially available only in left-hand-drive form, as the floorpan allowed only for a left-hand-drive version. Smart subsequently designed a floorpan for right-hand-drive models. The Fortwo was marketed in 37 countries worldwide.

=== Australia ===
The Smart Fortwo was marketed through select Mercedes-Benz dealers in Australia from 2003 to 2015 in only the middle 'Pulse' range, and with the petrol engine. In 2007, the base price for the Fortwo coupé was A$19,900, and the Fortwo cabriolet was $22,900. Mercedes-Benz stopped selling the Smart brand in Australia in 2015 due to declining sales.

=== Brazil ===
The smart Fortwo was officially marketed through select Mercedes-Benz dealers in Brazil only from 2009 to 2015 (exclusively in its second generation), only with petrol engines. It was offered with the "micro-hybrid drive" natural aspirated engine (mhd) in standard configuration with a special edition named "Brazilian Edition" which was offered only in yellow (in reference to the Brazilian Flag) with a Brazilian flag sticker on both sides, and turbocharged versions named "standard" (no name), Tritop, and Passion. The mhd were offered only in "coupé" configuration with no sunroof, and turbocharged versions were offered in both coupé (with sunroof) and cabrio variants.

A few units of the fortwo Brabus were also offered in Brazil in the year 2010.

In 2016, Mercedes-Benz decided to discontinue offer of the fortwo in Brazilian market, hence Brazilian customers never had the option of the 453.

There are also a few W450s in Brazil, although they weren't officially imported by Mercedes-Benz and have no official support.

=== China ===
In April 2008, Smart premiered at the 2008 Beijing Auto Show. In October 2008, the Smart "vending machine" road show had the first stop in Shenyang and began the Fortwo's pre-order period.

=== Japan ===
The Fortwo is one of few non-Japanese cars ever to fulfil the regulations for Kei cars. There was a Japan-only variant of the first generation Smart Fortwo which met the kei regulations, with slightly narrower fenders and skinnier tires, called the Smart K.

=== Canada ===
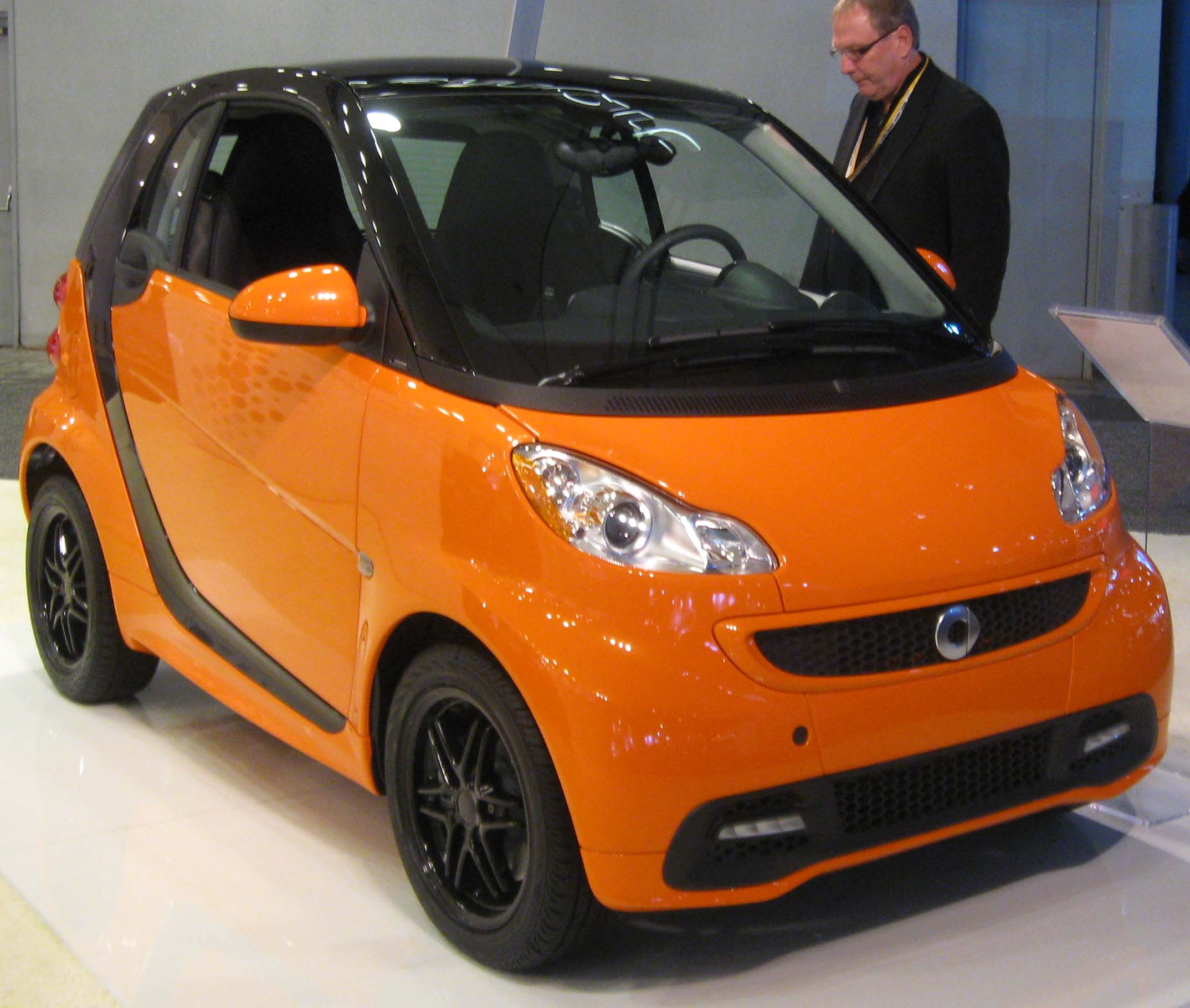
2013 Smart Fortwo

The smart fortwo was introduced in Canada in September 2004 and sold through Mercedes-Benz dealers. Only the turbo-diesel powerplant was offered for the 450 coupé and 450 convertible models because the fuel vapour recovery system for the gasoline-powered car would have had to be redesigned to meet Transport Canada standards. Diesels do not require such a system because the fuel is not volatile, so the cdi was certified instead. Demand was initially heavy, with up to six-month waiting lists in major urban areas in the spring of 2005. 10,242 cdi cars were imported in model years 2005 and 2006. Two or three of these were used in Transport Canada crash testing.

Canada received three special versions of the 450 cdi: the grandstyle—only available in dark green with silver, and beige leather—of which 200 were imported in coupé and cabriolet forms, the BRABUS Nightrun—equipped with BRABUS accessories at the Hambach factory, which only came as a black on black (with blue-grey leather) coupé, and 50 of those were delivered, and finally the BRABUS Tailor Made Canada 1 models, of which only four were produced, three red on red and one white on white, all with highest equipment levels and all BRABUS accessories, high-quality dyed-through leather and Alcantara interiors. The white car is a cabriolet, as are two of the red ones. The sole Canada 1 coupé has a fixed glass roof.

In 2008, Canada received only the gasoline 451 model because the diesel version did not meet 2007 Canadian emission standards. The 451 fortwo carries a 1.0-litre engine that delivers up to 70 horsepower (52 kW) and a re-engineered automated-manual 5-speed transmission with a slightly larger body. This engine has been the sole powertrain for Canada since the 451 was introduced—even the BRABUS models only have 70 HP. The 451 has sold very well in Canada: over 12,600 were registered between the start of 2008 and the end of 2012. The lack of a diesel option has hindered 451 sales to some owners of the diesel 450s.

Canada received several special versions of the 451 as well: the limited 1, the limited 3, the highstyle, the greystyle, the edit10n BRABUS Tailor Made (ten coupés), one all orange "Ultimate" BRABUS Tailor Made, the sharpred, among others.

Smart Canada released ten tenth anniversary edition smart Fortwo cars in February 2009. Each car started life as a Canadian BRABUS model before being converted into tenth anniversary editions by BRABUS in Germany. All examples feature arctic grey metallic paint with brown and alcantara leather interiors and black BRABUS Monoblock 7 wheels. The cars carry a number plate on the dash to signify its production number out of ten.

Smart Canada also commissioned Busch Automodelle GmbH to produce 1:87 scale versions (with a black tridion), of which 10,000 were made.

=== United States ===
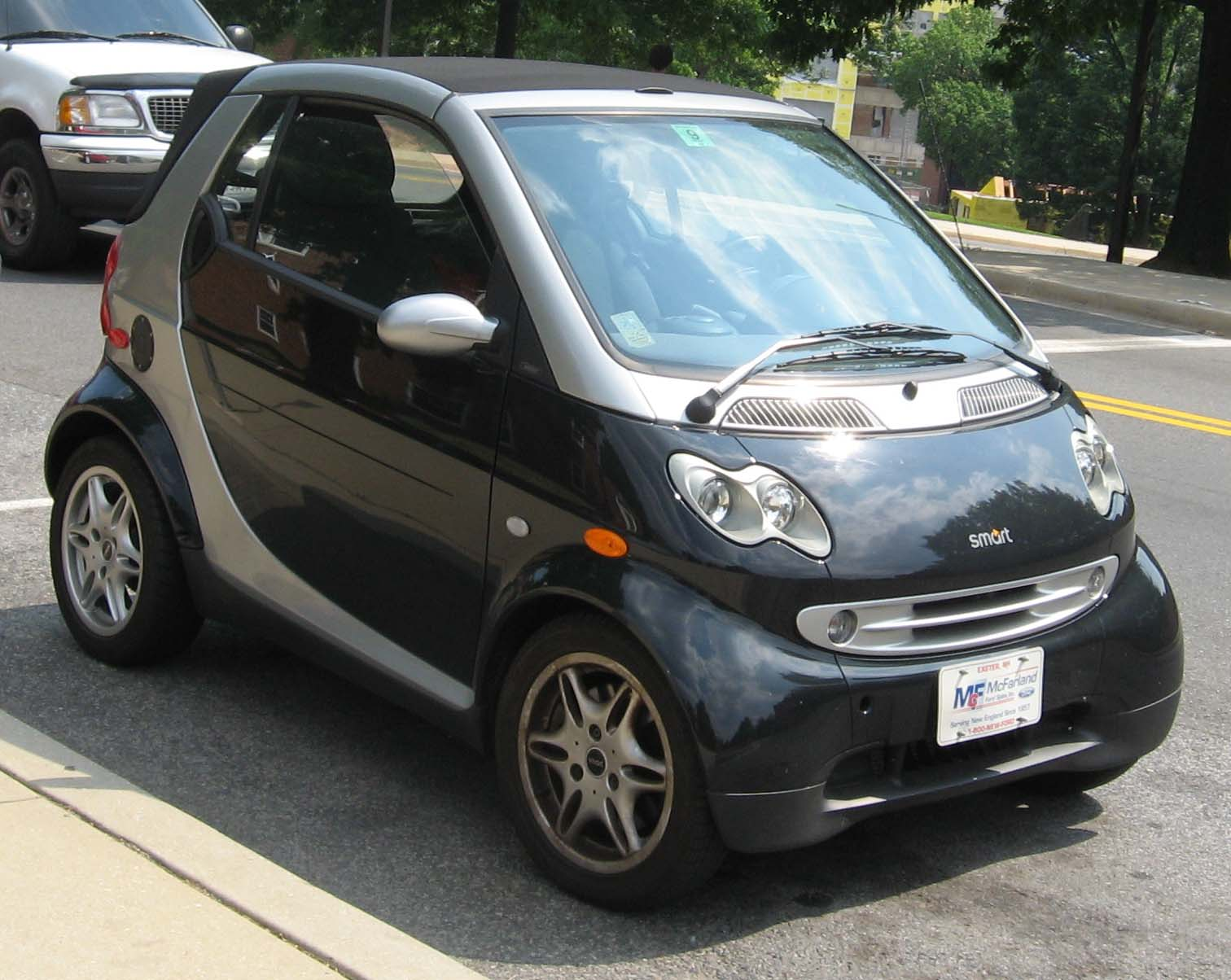
G & K Auto conversion model in the US

In June 2002, a Smart Fortwo was exhibited in the U.S. at the Museum of Modern Art (MoMA) affiliate P.S. 1 in Queens, New York.

In January 2005, DaimlerChrysler showed the Smart brand at the North American International Auto Show in Detroit, Michigan. Smart Forfour, Smart Roadster, Smart Fortwo Coupé and Smart Fortwo Cabrio models were shown.

In September 2006, Daimler AG announced that Smart USA, a division of Penske Auto Group would officially distribute Smart in the United States and Puerto Rico. Subsequently, the second generation Smart Fortwo (Model 451) became available in January 2008, but the ForFour and the Roadster were never available in this market.

The 2009 model year US version of the Smart Fortwo was available in three trims: Pure (base trim), Passion, and Passion cabriolet. Pure has an MSRP of US$11,990, Passion has an MSRP of $13,990, and the Passion Cabriolet has an MSRP $16,990. A reservation program was launched by Smart USA in March 2007. This program allowed interested parties to place a $99 refundable deposit on the new Fortwo in preparation for the product's launch. After the product's launch, sales have surpassed production and the reservation program continued as a "wait list" program. The average wait was 12 to 18 months for delivery; although due to economic conditions at the time, many buyers could not purchase the vehicles when they were ready for delivery and many were available on dealer lots.

The Fortwo was rated as the most fuel efficient two-seater car in the United States Environmental Protection Agency's (EPA) 2008 Fuel Economy Guide, with fuel efficiency ratings of 33 mpg_{‑US} (7.1 L/100 km; 40 mpg_{‑imp}) city and 41 mpg_{‑US} (5.7 L/100 km; 49 mpg_{‑imp}) highway. The 2008 Smart Fortwo coupe was given an EPA fuel efficiency rating of 36 mpg_{‑US} (6.5 L/100 km; 43 mpg_{‑imp}) combined.

On May 14, 2008, the Insurance Institute for Highway Safety released crash test results for the Fortwo. The IIHS gave the Fortwo top ratings in protecting passengers in front and side crashes. However, the U.S. National Highway Traffic Safety Administration (NHTSA) cited a Safety Concern on their tests of a 2008 Fortwo, stating "during the side impact test, the driver door unlatched and opened. A door opening during a side impact crash increases the likelihood of occupant ejection."

For model years 2012 and later, the U.S. Fortwo Coupe featured eight airbags (front, knee, side and window curtain), while the Cabrio model featured six airbags (front, knee and side-mounted combination head/thorax).

In early 2006, prior to formal importation to the United States, a specialty firm—G and K Auto conversions of Santa Ana, California—received DOT, NHTSA, and EPA approval to market a modified European specification Smart Fortwo in the US. Modifications for the grey market vehicles included DOT certified headlights, front and rear side marker lights, reinforced doors for additional side impact protection, an odometer in miles rather than kilometres, and soft padding on the interior pillars and ceiling. Approximately 1,000 model year 2004, 2005, and 2006 cars were imported.

In September 2015, the third generation Smart Fortwo Coupe (C453) launched in the United States for the 2016 model year. US variants are offered in four trim levels: Pure, Passion, Prime and Proxy. Significant upgrades, including power steering, eight airbags, alarm, Bluetooth capability and crosswind assist technology were made standard. The 2016 Smart Fortwo also received a new engine, the 0.9 liter 3-cylinder turbocharged unit making 89 horsepower and 100 pound-feet of torque as standard. Both a 5-speed manual transmission and a 6-speed dual-clutch automatic transmission are offered.

In August 2016, the redesigned 2017 Smart Fortwo Cabrio (A453) joined the smart USA lineup, offered in three trim levels; Passion, Prime and Proxy. The Cabrio model makes use of the same gasoline engine and transmissions as the C453 Fortwo Coupe. A BRABUS Sport Package was also added for 2017 for Fortwo Coupe and Cabrio models, adding unique front and rear body styling, wheels, interior appointments and a retuned sport suspension.

The fourth generation Smart Fortwo Electric Drive made its debut at the 2016 Paris Motor Show. The newest generation, built on the C453 chassis, features a new 17.6 kWh lithium-ion battery and an air-cooled electric motor which produce 81 horsepower and 118 lb.-ft. of torque. A new 7.2 kW onboard charger was added, and Smart advertised a charging time of 2.5 hours at a 240 V electrical outlet. EPA estimated range was 58 miles, and the vehicle was rated at 124 MPGe City, making it the most efficient 2 seat vehicle on sale in the USA. The 2017 Smart Fortwo electric drive is offered in both Coupe and Cabrio versions in all 50 states, and qualifies for a $7,500 federal tax incentive.

In February 2017, Smart USA announced the brand would discontinue gasoline vehicle sales after the 2017 model year and focus purely on battery electric vehicles. The Smart Fortwo Electric Drive arrived as a 2017 model in the summer of 2017, and the transition to electric-only occurred for the 2018 model year.

The year 2018 marked 10 years of Smart Fortwo sales in the United States, and the brand offered a special tenth anniversary edition specific to the United States market to celebrate. The edition was available for Passion and Prime lines of the Fortwo Coupe, and consisted of:

- Exclusive Sapphire Blue Metallic body panels, mirror caps, tridion cell, and grille
- 16-Inch BRABUS Monoblock VII Wheels in Matte Anthracite Grey
- Sport Package
- BRABUS-created edition exterior badging in place of the line badge
- Custom-stitched '10th anniversary' BRABUS floor mats
- Tenth anniversary BRABUS shift knob

In April 2019, sales were terminated in the U.S. and Canada. The vehicle never met sales goals.

=== South Africa ===
The smart fortwo was officially marketed through select Mercedes-Benz dealers in South-Africa only with petrol engines.

== Chinese copy controversy ==
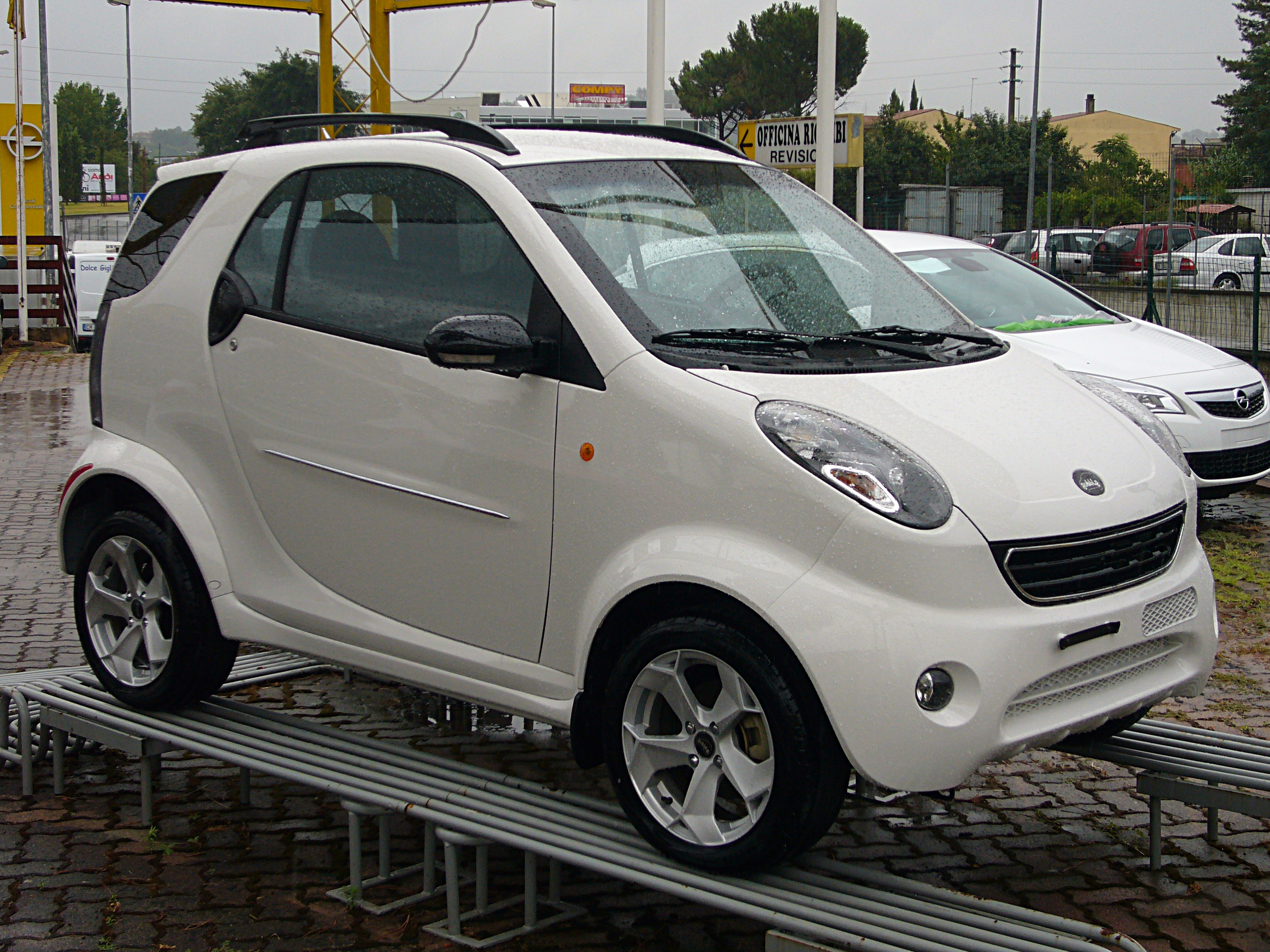
Shuanghuan Noble (Martin Motors) front quarter

In 2007, Chinese manufacturer Shuanghuan Auto released the Shuanghuan Noble (also known as the Martin Motors Bubble), designed similarly to the Fortwo and prompting Daimler AG to sue Shuanghuan for copyright infringement. The German manufacturer persuaded the Italian court to prohibit the Noble from being exhibited at the Bologna Motor Show, but importer Martin Motors violated that injunction and put the car on display.

In May 2009, a Greek judge ruled against Daimler, allowing the Noble to be sold in Greece. The judge cited that "if a vehicle varies in its technical specification, then any external similarities are irrelevant." This was in reference to the Noble being a front-engine, front-wheel-drive car, while the Fortwo is a similar sized rear-engine and rear-wheel-drive car.
