= Mitsubishi Motors platforms =

Mitsubishi platforms are the automobile platforms used by Mitsubishi Motors for their production automobiles. Mirroring trends throughout the automotive industry, the company is reducing the number of distinct platforms, and increasing platform sharing across its ranges. Following DaimlerChrysler's purchase of a controlling stake in Mitsubishi in 2001, part of the subsequent cost-cutting drive initiated by Rolf Eckrodt upon his employment as chief executive officer of MMC was to reduce the number of platforms from twelve to six. Similarly, Stefan Jacoby, the CEO of Mitsubishi Motor Sales Europe, expressed concern in 2002 that the company would need to rationalize its platforms, even if the number of models sold were to increase.

== GS platform ==
The Mitsubishi GS platform, also known as "Project Global", is used in compact cars in North America, small family cars in Europe, and lower medium cars in Japan. It was first developed during DaimlerChrysler's tenure as Mitsubishi's controlling shareholder between 2001 and 2005. Mitsubishi were also given responsibility for developing small and medium car platforms for the entire group during this time, although since the German and Japanese companies' divorce Chrysler, who were dependent on Mitsubishi, now claim greater autonomy in platform development. All Mitsubishi vehicles using the GS platform are made in Japan, beginning with the 2005 Outlander crossover SUV.

== PS platform ==
The Mitsubishi PS platform, also known as "Project America", is a mid-size, front-wheel drive platform developed by Mitsubishi Motors North America. All vehicles built at the Diamond-Star Motors facility in Normal, Illinois are underpinned by the platform, as is the Australian built Mitsubishi 380, which is loosely derived from the PS-based ninth generation of the Mitsubishi Galant.

== Z platform ==
The Mitsubishi Z platform is a small-car platform jointly developed by DaimlerChrysler and Mitsubishi Motors since 2001, and first introduced in the 2003 Mitsubishi Colt. It was also used a year later in the Smart Forfour, and was to have underpinned DaimlerChrysler's Smart Formore mini SUV until that project was discontinued.
