= Mitsubishi Z platform =

Overview
- Manufacturer: Mitsubishi Motors; DaimlerChrysler
- Production: 2003–2012

Body and chassis
- Class: Small car (Japan); Supermini (Europe)
- Vehicles: Mitsubishi Colt; Smart Forfour; Smart Formore

The Mitsubishi Z platform was a small-car platform jointly developed by DaimlerChrysler and Mitsubishi Motors since 2001 and used in the Mitsubishi Colt first introduced in 2003. It was also used a year later in the Smart Forfour, and was to have underpinned DaimlerChrysler's Smart Formore mini SUV until that project was discontinued.

The Mitsubishi Colt, which was built at the NedCar plant in Born, Netherlands, the Pininfarina carrozzeria in Turin, Italy and the Okazaki, Aichi plant in Japan, was the only Mitsubishi model to use the platform. The Smart Forfour, which shared the platform from 2004, was discontinued in 2006, making the Colt the sole remaining Z-platform vehicle until its own production ended in 2012.

== Uses ==
=== Mitsubishi ===
- Mitsubishi Colt (2004-2012)

=== Smart ===
==== Released ====
- Smart Forfour (2004-2006)

==== Unreleased ====
- Smart Formore
