= Smart Forspeed =

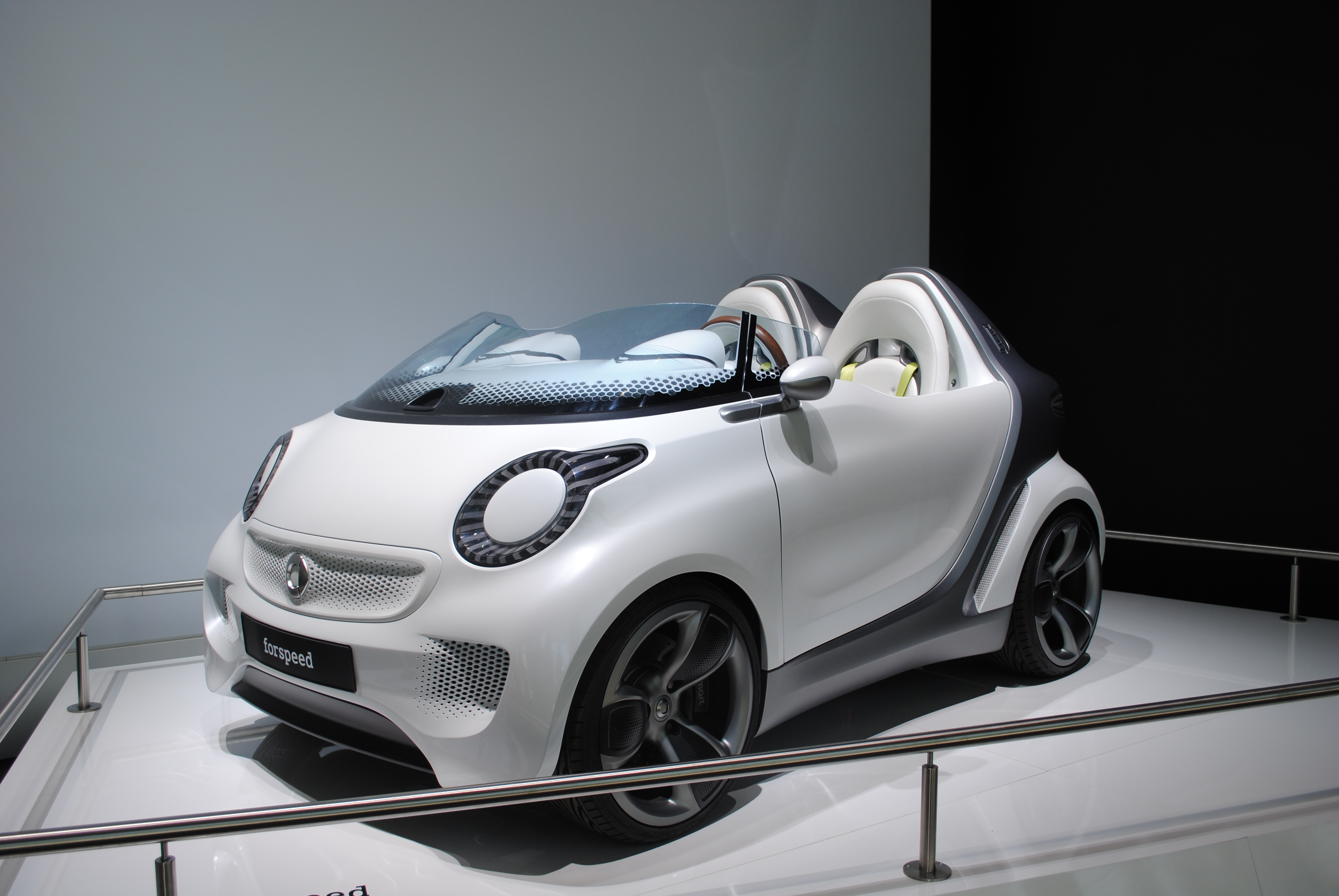
- Smart Forspeed at Frankfurt Motor Show 2011

Overview
- Type: Concept Car
- Manufacturer: Smart (marque)

Body and chassis
- Layout: Rear-wheel drive

Powertrain
- Engine: Rear-mounted, 30kW, electric motor

The Smart Forspeed is a concept car first shown to the public at the 2011 Geneva Motor Show by the Smart division of Daimler AG.

It is a two-seater electric roadster, powered by a rear-mounted 40 bhp (30 kW; 41 PS) electric motor with a 7 bhp (5 kW; 7 PS) overboost function. The electric motor draws power from a 16.5 kWh lithium-ion power cell and the Forspeed has a claimed a maximum range of 84 miles (135.2 km), and a top speed of 75 mph (121 km/h).

Charging of the power cell is by a 220 volt port which is located between the rear light clusters, and can be charged to 80% in 45 minutes. The design of the Forspeed includes solar cells incorporated into the wind deflector.
