= Smart 3 =

Battery electric compact crossover SUV

Smart #3
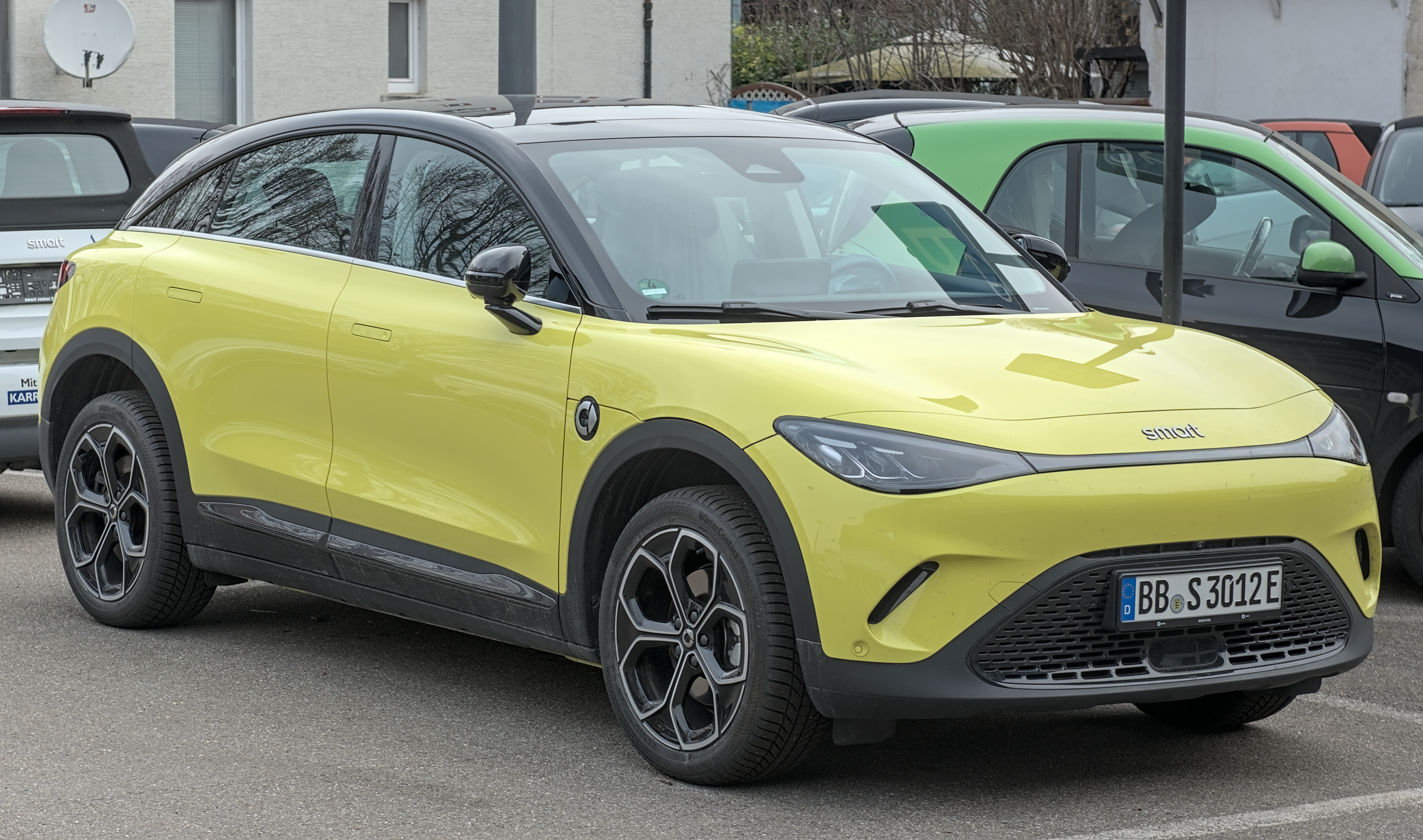

Overview
- Manufacturer: Smart Automobile
- Model code: HC11
- Also called: Smart Jingling #3 (China)
- Production: 2023–present
- Assembly: China: Xi'an, Shaanxi

Body and chassis
- Class: Compact crossover SUV (C)
- Body style: 5-door coupe SUV
- Layout: Rear-motor, rear-wheel-drive; Dual-motor, four-wheel-drive (Brabus)
- Platform: SEA2/PMA2
- Related: Smart #1

Powertrain
- Electric motor: 1× or 2× permanent magnet synchronous
- Power output: 268 hp (272 PS; 200 kW); 422 hp (428 PS; 315 kW) (Brabus)
- Transmission: 1-speed direct-drive
- Battery: 49 kWh LFP Rept Battero (Pro); 66 kWh nickel-cobalt-manganese Sunwoda (Pro+, Premium, Brabus)
- Range: 420–455 km (261–283 mi) (WLTP)
- Plug-in charging: 22 kW (AC); 150 kW (DC)

Dimensions
- Wheelbase: 2,785 mm (109.6 in)
- Length: 4,440 mm (174.8 in)
- Width: 1,844 mm (72.6 in)
- Height: 1,556 mm (61.3 in)
- Curb weight: 1,820 kg (4,012 lb)

The Smart #3 (stylised as "smart #3") is a battery electric compact crossover SUV developed and produced by Smart Automobile, a joint venture between Mercedes-Benz Group and Geely Holding. It is the second vehicle produced by the joint venture. The model is based on the Sustainable Experience Architecture (SEA) electric vehicle platform developed by Geely. In China, the model is marketed as the Smart Jingling #3 (Chinese: 精灵#3; pinyin: Jingling Sanhao; lit. 'Elf #3').

== Overview ==
The Smart #3 debuted on 17 April 2023 at the Auto Shanghai show. The model had its European premiere at the IAA in September 2023, with sales there to begin in early 2024.

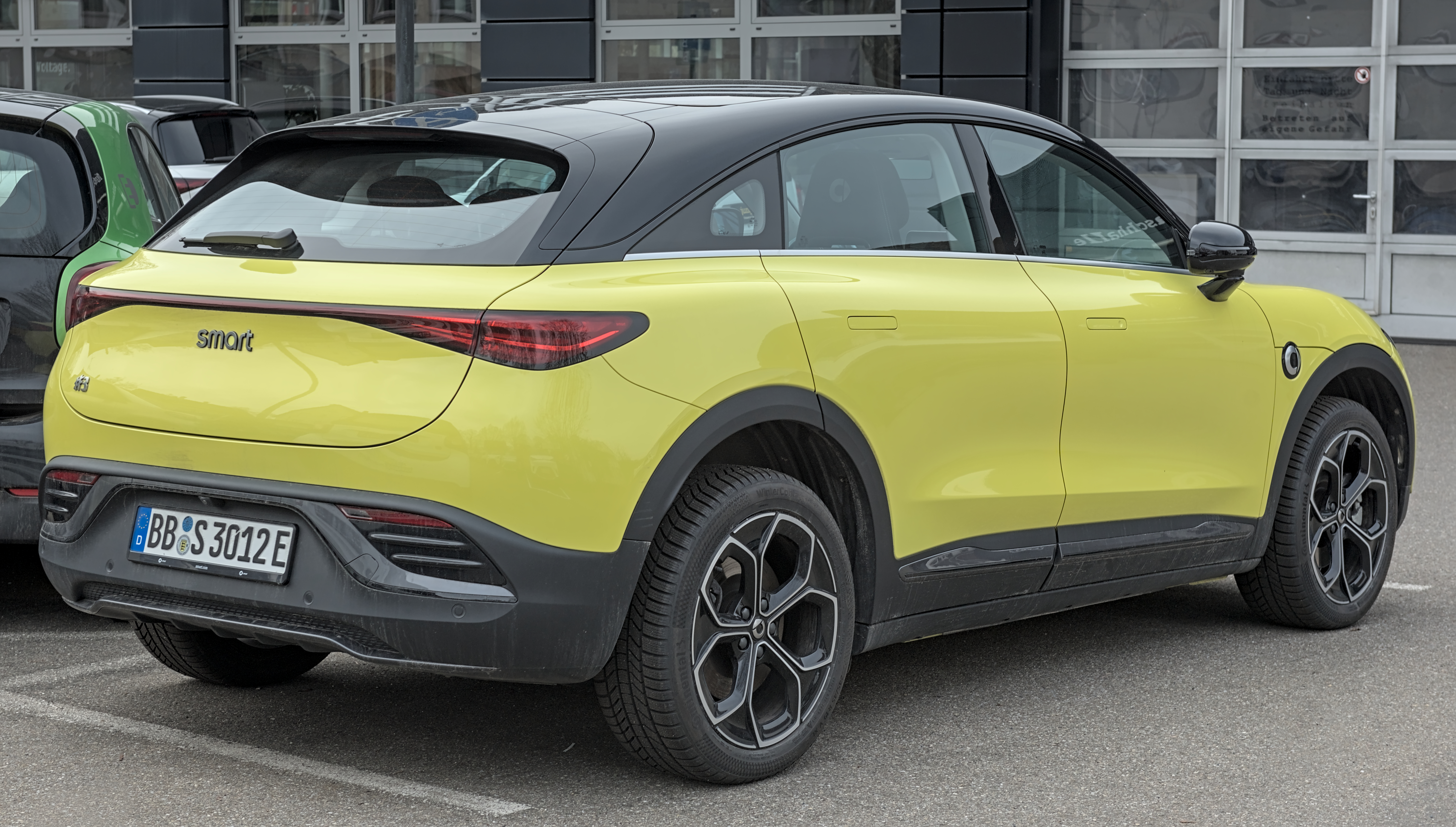
Rear view

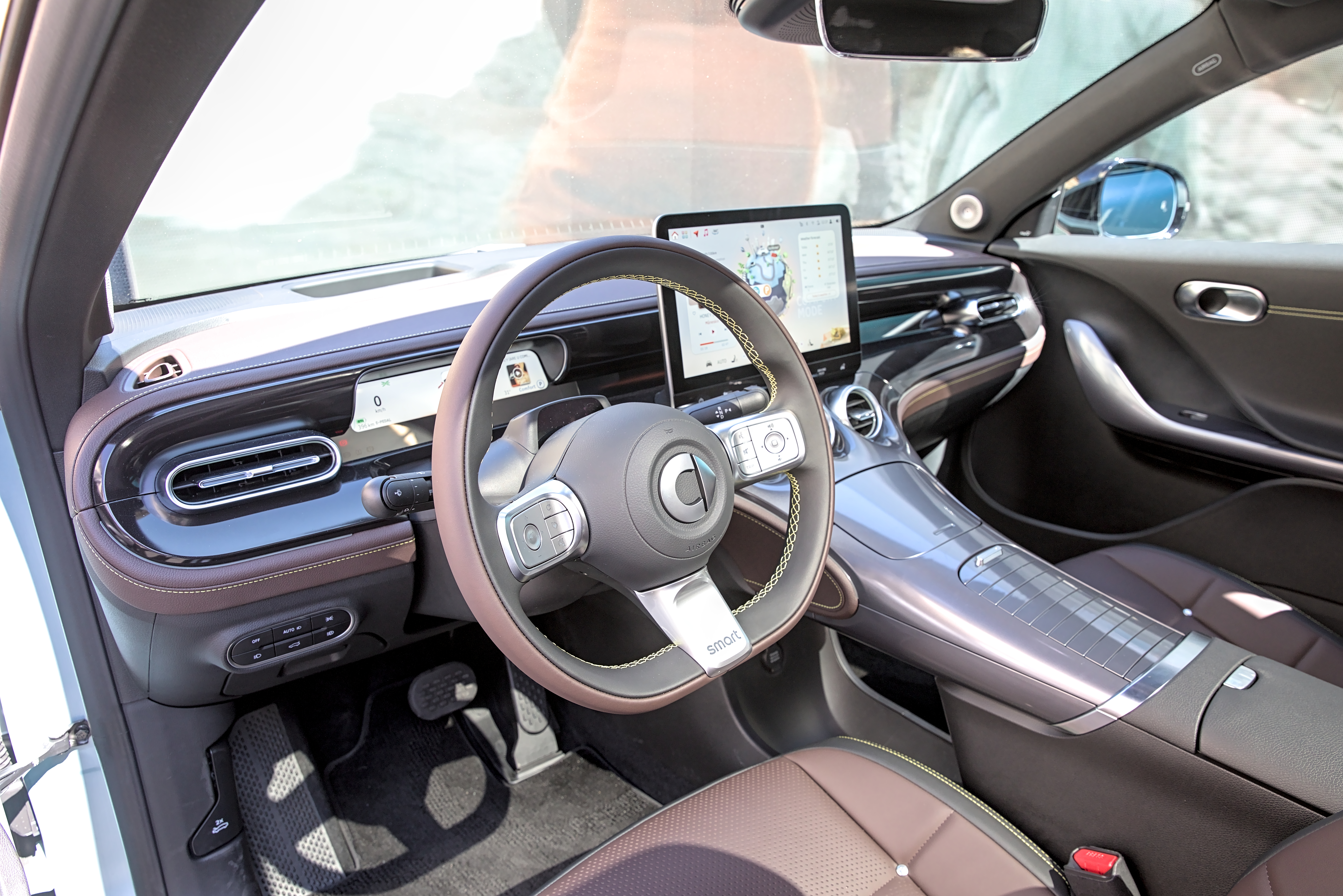
Interior

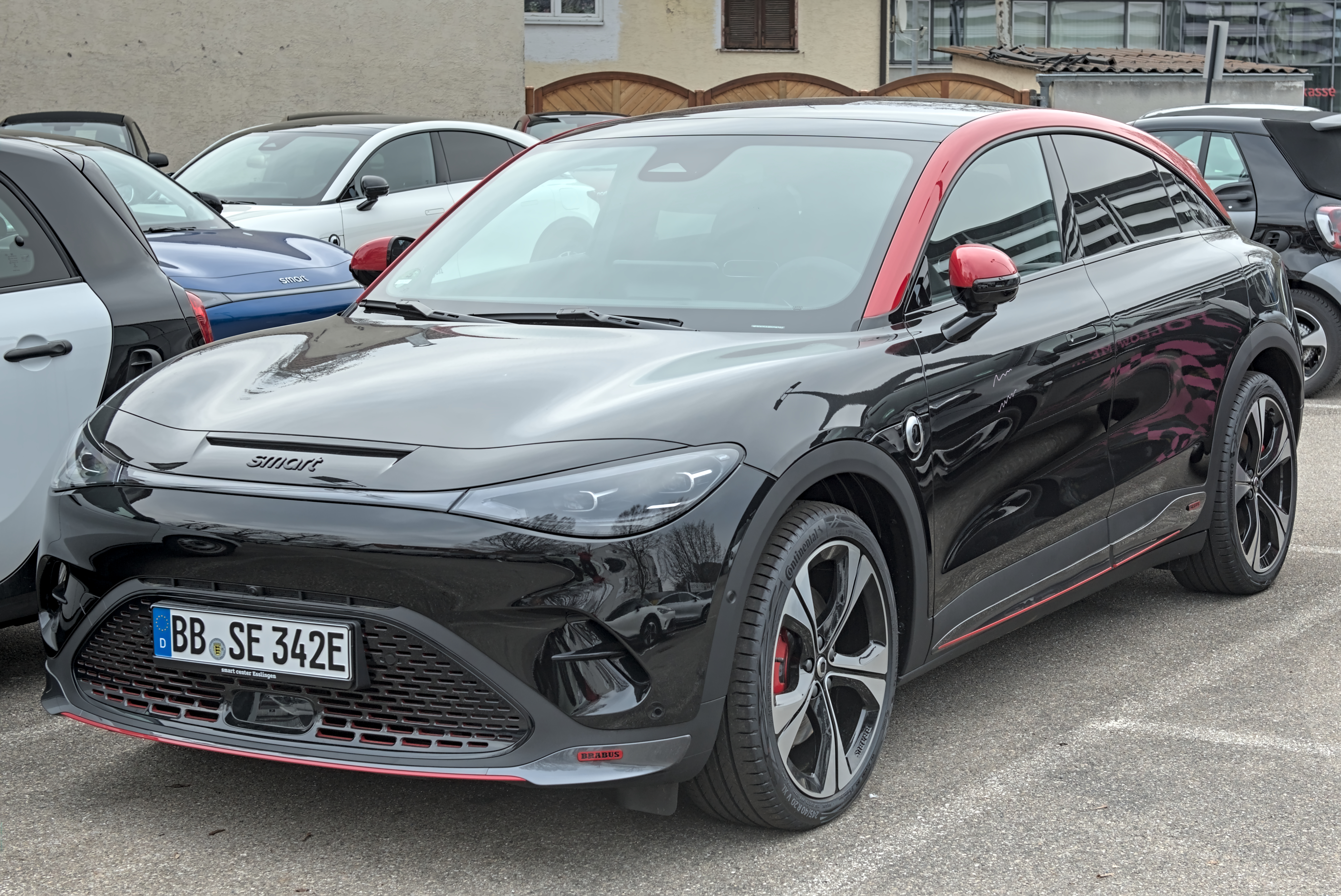
Smart #3 Brabus

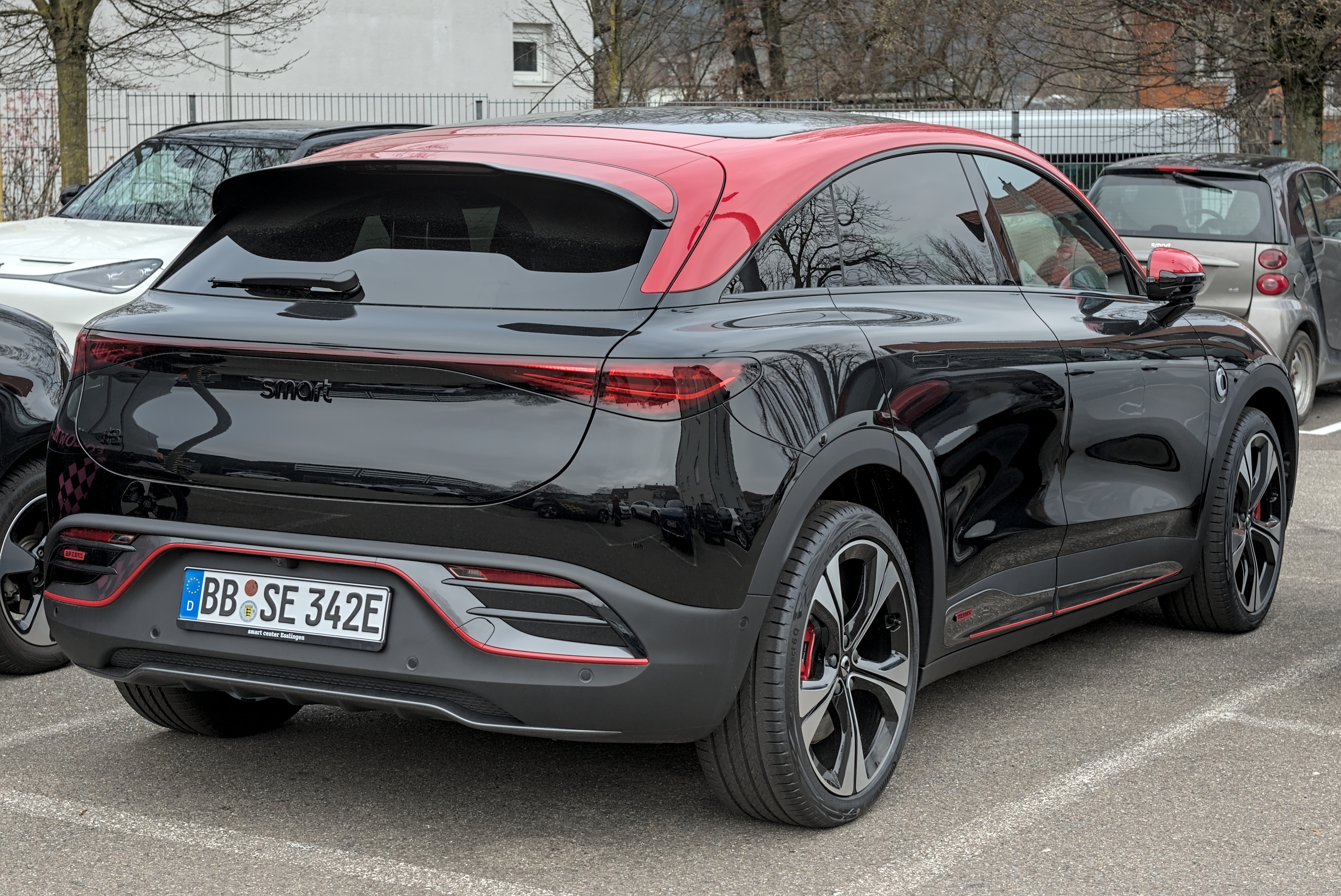
Rear view (Brabus)

== Technology ==
The #3 is based on the Sustainable Experience Architecture (SEA) electric vehicle platform developed by Geely. The rear motor produces 200 kW (272 PS; 268 hp) and offers a torque of 343 N⋅m (253 lb⋅ft). The additional front motor, which is reserved for the Brabus version of the #3, produces 115 kW (156 PS; 154 hp). A nickel-manganese-cobalt battery with an energy capacity of 66 kWh enables a range of 415 to 455 km (258 to 283 miles) according to WLTP. The alternating current charging power of the onboard charger is 22 kW. Direct current charging is possible with a power output of up to 150 kW, allowing the vehicle to be charged from 10 to 80% in less than 30 minutes. A base model with a 49-kWh lithium iron phosphate battery and slightly lower charging performance was also introduced with a slight delay. In addition to a conventional trunk with 370 litres (13.1 cu ft) of storage space, the Smart #3, like some other electric car models, has a small front storage compartment (so-called frunk) with a capacity of 15 litres (0.530 cu ft).

=== Technical specifications ===
	#3		#3 Brabus
Production period	since 06/2023		
Engine specifications
Engine type	Electric motor rear		Electric motor front and rear
Motor design	Permanent magnet synchronous motor		
Max. power	200 kW (272 PS; 268 hp)		315 kW (428 PS; 422 hp)
Max. torque	343 N⋅m (253 lb⋅ft)		543 N⋅m (400 lb⋅ft)
Drivetrain
Drive configuration	Rear-wheel drive		All-wheel drive
Transmission	Single-speed fixed gear		
Battery
Cell chemistry	LFP	NMC	
Energy capacity	49 kWh	66 kWh	
Performance
Range according to WLTP	325 km (202 mi)	435–455 km (270–283 mi)	415 km (258 mi)
Energy consumption per 100 km (WLTP, combined)	17.2 kWh	16.3–16.8 kWh	17.6 kWh
Acceleration, 0–100 km/h (0–62 mph)	5.8 s		3.7 s
Top speed	180 km/h (112 mph)		
Max. charging power (AC)	7.4 kW	22 kW	
Max. charging power (DC)	130 kW	150 kW	
Curb weight	1,780 kg (3,924 lb)	1,780–1,810 kg (3,924–3,990 lb)	1,910 kg (4,211 lb)

== Safety ==
ANCAP test results Smart #3 all variants (2023, aligned with Euro NCAP)
Test	Points	%
Overall:	5 /5 stars	
Adult occupant:	36.25	90%
Child occupant:	42.13	85%
Pedestrian:	52.98	84%
Safety assist:	15.51	86%

Euro NCAP test results smart 3 Pro+ RWD (LHD) (2023)
Test	Points	%
Overall:	5 /5 stars	
Adult occupant:	36.3	90%
Child occupant:	42.3	86%
Pedestrian:	53	84%
Safety assist:	15.4	85%

== Sales ==
Year	China
2023	8,208
2024	9,538
2025	4,428
