= Annette Winkler =

German businessman

- Born: September 27, 1959 (age 67); Wiesbaden, West Germany
- Education: Goethe University Frankfurt
- Occupation: Member of the advisory board of Mercedes-Benz South Africa (2019-present)

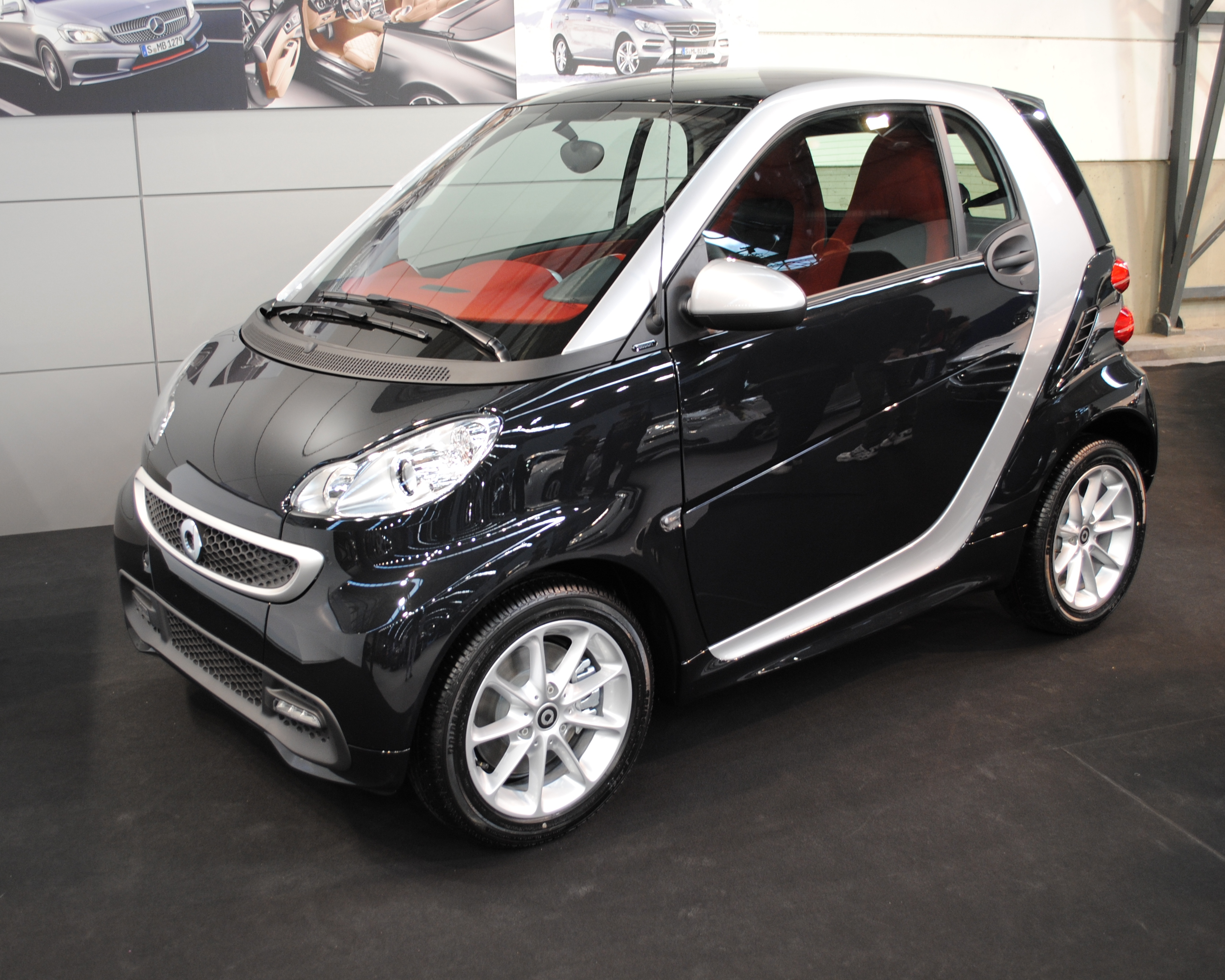
2013 Smart Fortwo

Annette Winkler is a German business executive widely known for her role as the CEO and director of Smart Automobile, the division of Daimler AG noted for manufacturing and marketing the two-passenger Smart Fortwo and four-passenger Smart Forfour city cars, from 2010 to 2018.

As the first woman to head a Daimler brand, Automotive News Europe described Winkler's 2010 appointment as "a significant victory for women in a male-dominated industry".

In early 2018, Daimler announced Winkler retirement as the division's CEO at the end of September, 2018 after 23 years with the company. She was appointed as a member of the advisory board of Mercedes-Benz South Africa as of January 2019. She resigned from this position when she joined the Renault Board of Directors in order to avoid conflicts of interest.

== Background ==
Born in Wiesbaden, West Germany in 1959, Winkler completed training as an industrial clerk and thereafter an internship at the Karlsberg brewery in Homburg, Saarland. From 1980 to 1984 she studied in Frankfurt; received a degree in economics; completed her doctorate in business administration; and completed her thesis on corporate valuation and jurisprudence at the Goethe University Frankfurt.

== Career ==
At age 27 and upon her father's retirement, Winkler assumed the sole management of his construction company, A. Winkler Sohn GmbH & Co. KG, a family-owned business since 1824. Sales increased from 4 to 60 million euros under her direction. She was named the 1992 Entrepreneur of the Year by champagne house Veuve Clicquot. Six months after leaving her father's construction company, it was in receivership.

Daimler CEO Dieter Zetsche first met Winkler in 1995 at a convention in Stuttgart, where she stood out as a particularly strong speaker. Though she had no prior automotive or publicity experience, Daimler appointed Winkler that same year to head public relations and communications for Mercedes-Benz (1995–1997).

Winkler went on to head a Mercedes-Benz branch for passenger cars, trucks and After-Sales in Brunswick (1997–1999), where she learned and become licensed to drive heavy trucks in nine days in order to better understand the needs of her customers. She subsequently became CEO of Daimler (then DaimlerChrysler) of Belgium and Luxembourg (1999–2005) and after that the Vice President of Global Business Management & Wholesale Europe, in particular responsible for the worldwide dealer-network of the group (2005–2010). In 2010, succeeding Ulrich Walker, Winkler was appointed CEO of Smart, just as the brand was falling below the critical 100,000 annual sales figure and faced renewed competition with the Audi A1 and Fiat 500.

Winkler oversaw co-development with Renault of the forthcoming third generation Smart Fortwo (C453/W453 build series), indicating the vehicle would retain the rear-engine configuration, overall length as well as its hemispherical steel safety cell, marketed as the Tridion cell.

Also, under Winkler's direction, Smart focused on car sharing and rental programs — namely Daimler AG's Car2Go subsidiary — as well as development and marketing of electric bicycles.

As of 2014, Winkler joined the board of directors at Air Liquide, a French multinational company which supplies industrial gases and services to various industries, and became a Member of the Counsel for Foreign Economic Affairs of the German Ministry for Economics.

In 2018, Winkler resigned from Daimler, succeeded by Katrin Adt. In 2019, Winkler was appointed to Renault's Board of Directors.

== Personal ==
Growing up, Winkler was a classical music aficionado, intensively playing the piano. In 2011, she married Hanns-Michael Graf, an entrepreneur in the real estate and tourism. Winkler speaks fluent German, English, Dutch and French and is an avid bicyclist, having cycled some of the prominent mountain passes of the Tour de France.

Winkler drives the Fortwo electric drive "for jeremy", a unique version designed in collaboration with the fashion designer Jeremy Scott still owns a Smart fortwo she purchased in 2000 while living in Brussels, when she had been the head of Daimler of Belgium. Colleagues describe her as a "ständig aufgeladene Batterie" — a battery that's always fully charged.
