= Smart Forstars =

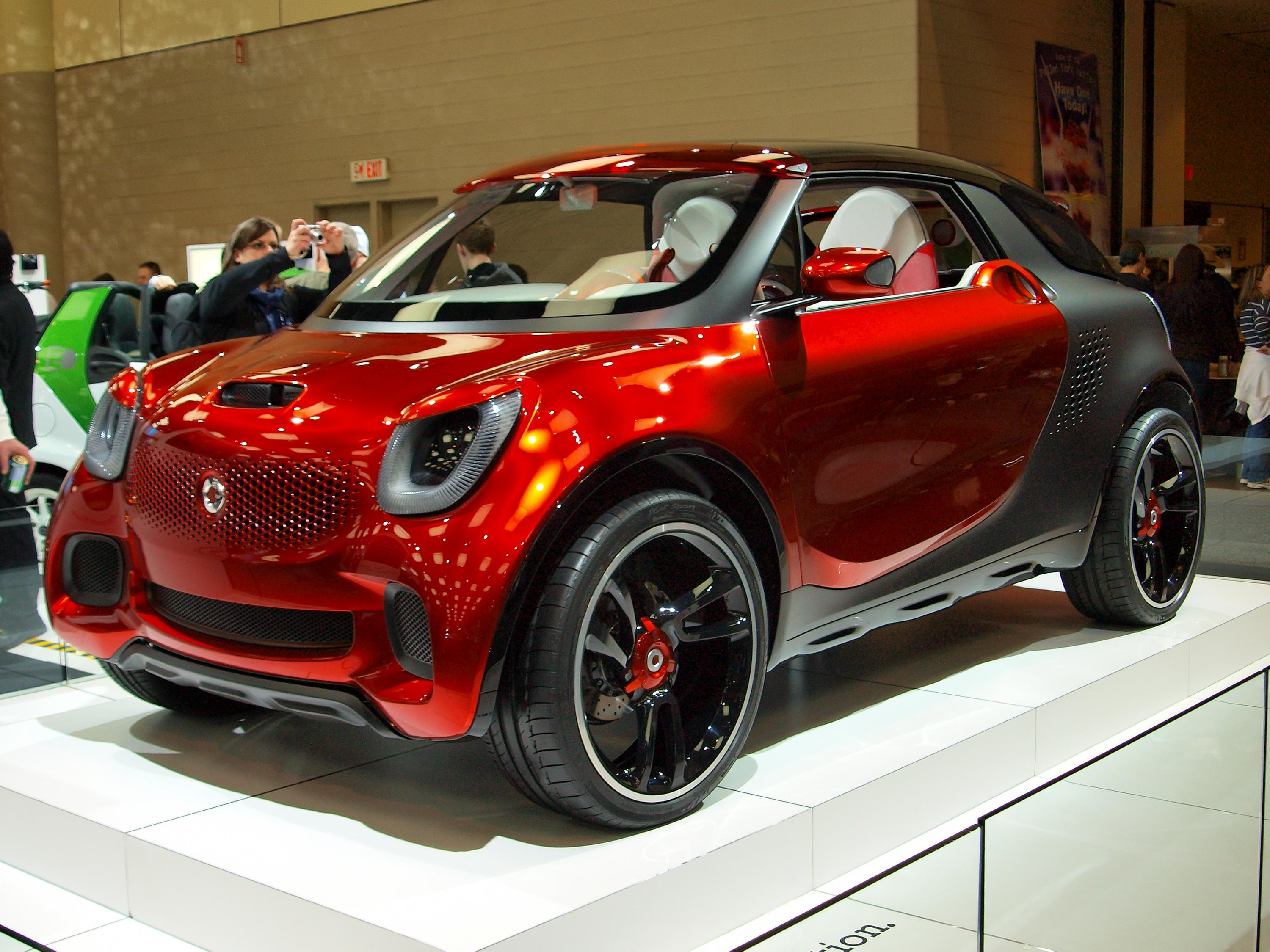

Overview
- Manufacturer: Smart
- Model years: 2012

Body and chassis
- Related: Smart For-Us

Dimensions
- Wheelbase: 2,470 mm (97.2 in)
- Length: 3,550 mm (139.8 in)
- Width: 1,710 mm (67.3 in)
- Height: 1,505 mm (59.3 in)

The Smart Forstars is a concept car produced by the Smart division of Daimler AG and unveiled at the 2012 Paris Motor Show. It can go up to 80 mph (129 km/h) with an 80 hp (60 kW) electric motor. It also has an all-electric drivetrain, which is nearly identical to the one used in the Smart Brabus electric drive. It is based on the same architecture of the Smart For-Us concept that was introduced in the Detroit Motor Show in 2012.
