= Smart 1 =

Battery electric subcompact crossover SUV

Smart #1
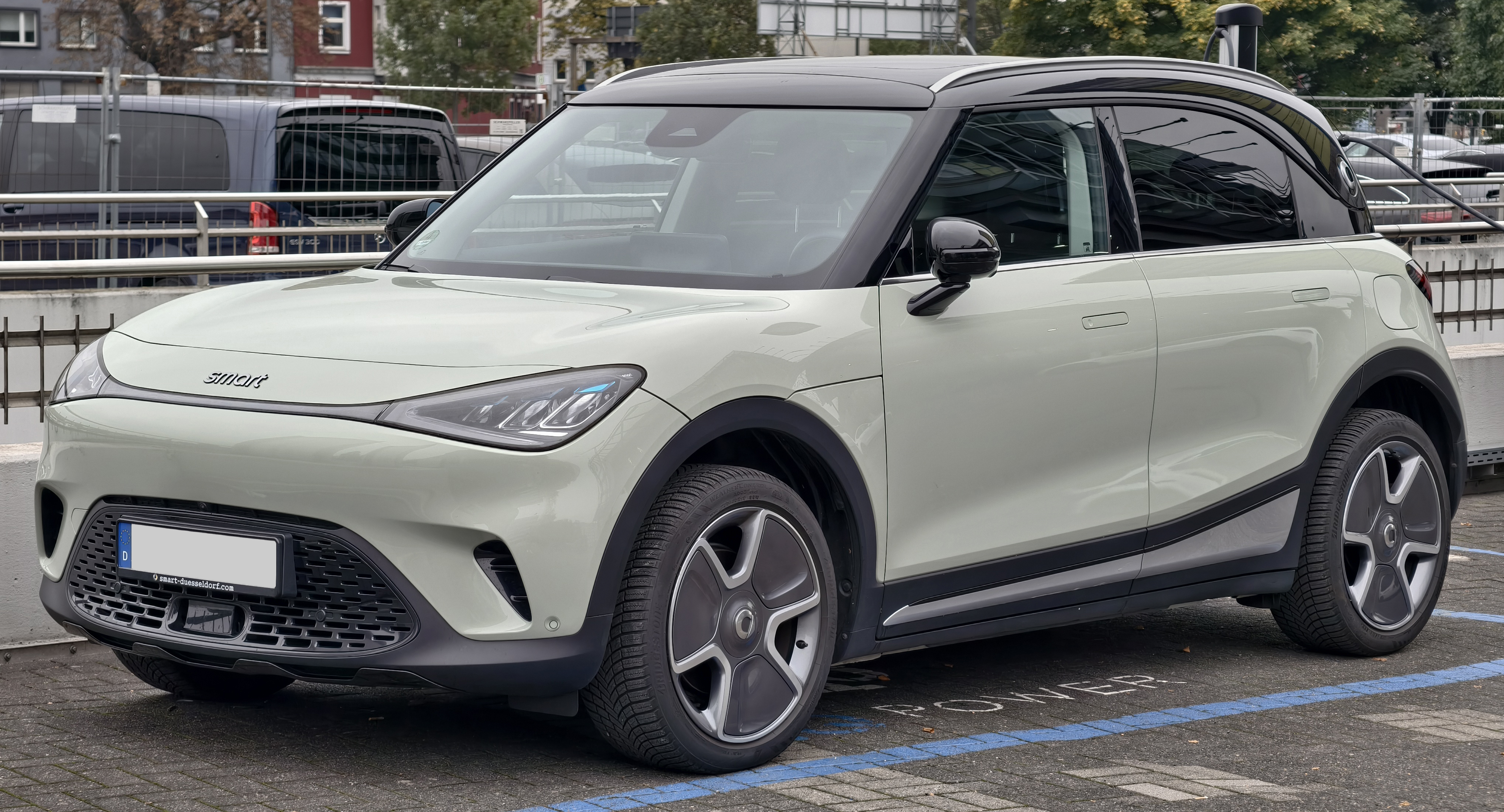

Overview
- Manufacturer: Smart Automobile
- Also called: Smart Jingling #1 (China)
- Production: 2022–present
- Assembly: China: Xi'an, Shaanxi
- Designer: Yi Gao and Mohammad Aminiyekta

Body and chassis
- Class: Subcompact crossover SUV (B)
- Body style: 5-door SUV
- Layout: Rear-motor, rear-wheel-drive; Dual-motor, four-wheel-drive (#1 Pulse and Brabus)
- Platform: Sustainable Experience Architecture 2 (SEA2)
- Related: Smart #3; Zeekr X; Volvo EX30

Powertrain
- Electric motor: 1× or 2× permanent magnet synchronous
- Power output: 200 kW (272 PS; 268 hp) (RWD); 315 kW (428 PS; 422 hp) (AWD)
- Transmission: 1-speed direct-drive
- Battery: 49 kWh LFP Rept Battero (Pure, Pro); 66 kWh nickel-cobalt-manganese Sunwoda (Pure+, Pro+, Pulse, Premium, Brabus)
- Electric range: 310–440 km (190–270 mi) (WLTP)
- Plug-in charging: 22 kW (AC); 150 kW (DC)

Dimensions
- Wheelbase: 2,750 mm (108.3 in)
- Length: 4,270 mm (168.1 in)
- Width: 1,822 mm (71.7 in)
- Height: 1,636 mm (64.4 in)
- Kerb weight: 1,820 kg (4,012 lb)

Chronology
- Predecessor: Smart EQ Forfour

The Smart #1 (stylised as "smart #1") is a battery electric subcompact crossover SUV developed and produced by Smart Automobile, a joint venture between Mercedes-Benz Group and Geely Holding. It is the first vehicle produced by the joint venture. The model is based on the Sustainable Experience Architecture (SEA) electric vehicle platform developed by Geely. In China, the model is marketed as the Smart Jingling #1 (Chinese: 精灵#1; pinyin: Jingling Yihao; lit. 'Elf #1').

== Overview ==
The production version was unveiled on 7 April 2022. It was developed under the codename HX11, with Mercedes-Benz providing the design while Geely handled engineering and production.

Prices for the European market were announced in September 2022.

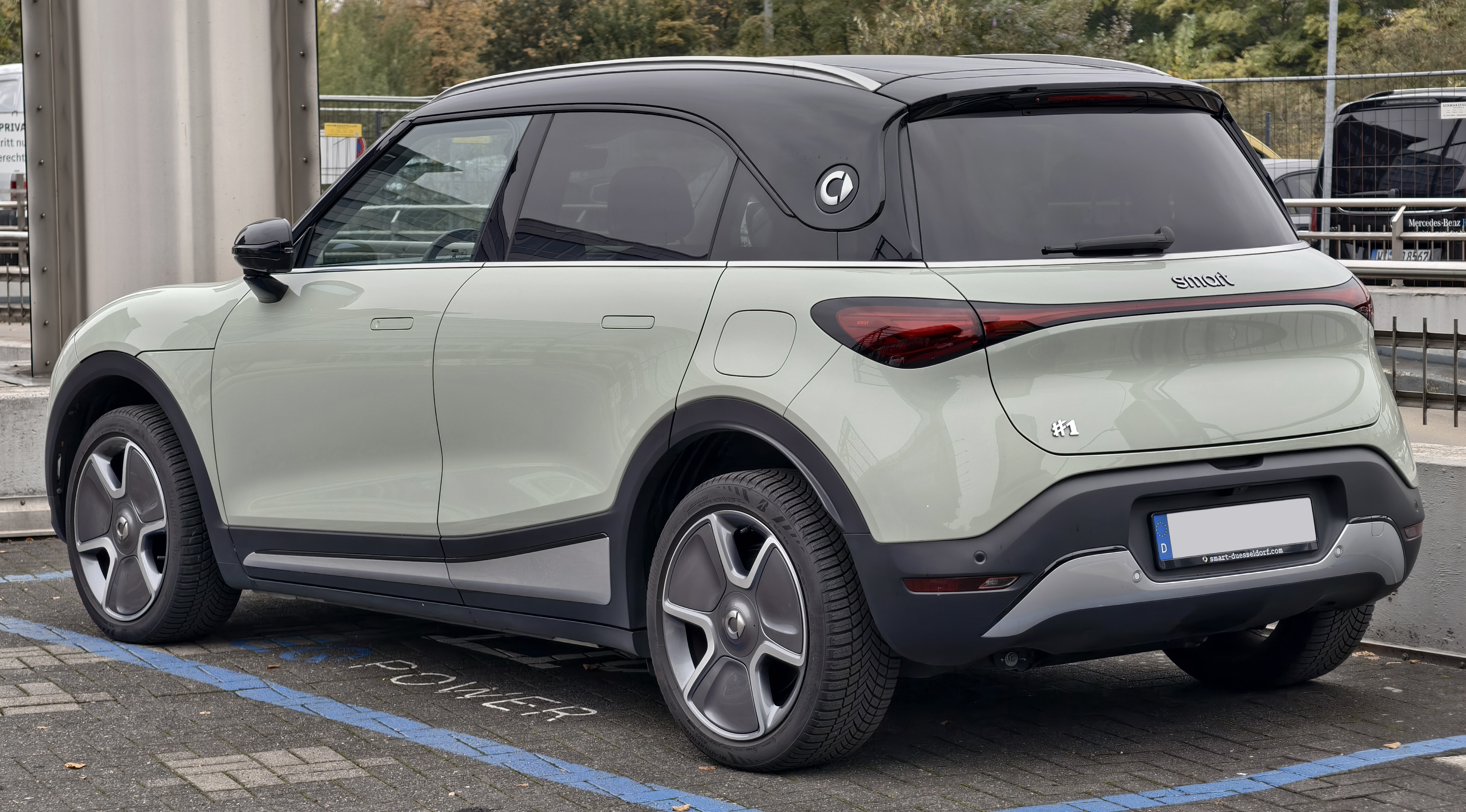
Rear view

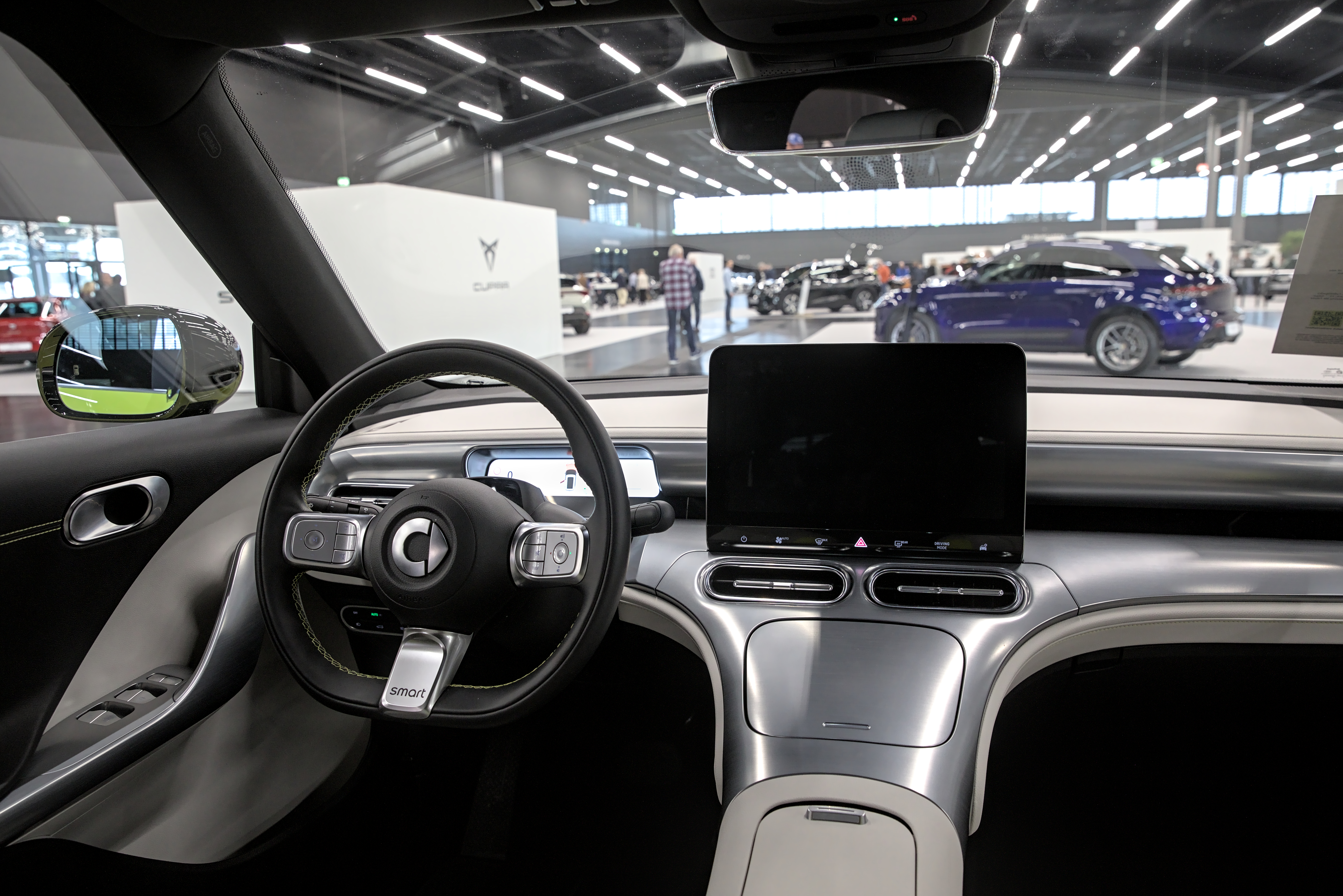
Interior

=== Concept Car ===
The vehicle was previewed by the Concept #1, which was showcased at the 2021 International Motor Show Germany (IAA) on September 5 in Munich, with features like concealed electric door handles, frameless doors, and a floating halo roof. It has a drag coefficient of 0.29. The concept emphasized digitalization with extensive connectivity features and over-the-air updates.

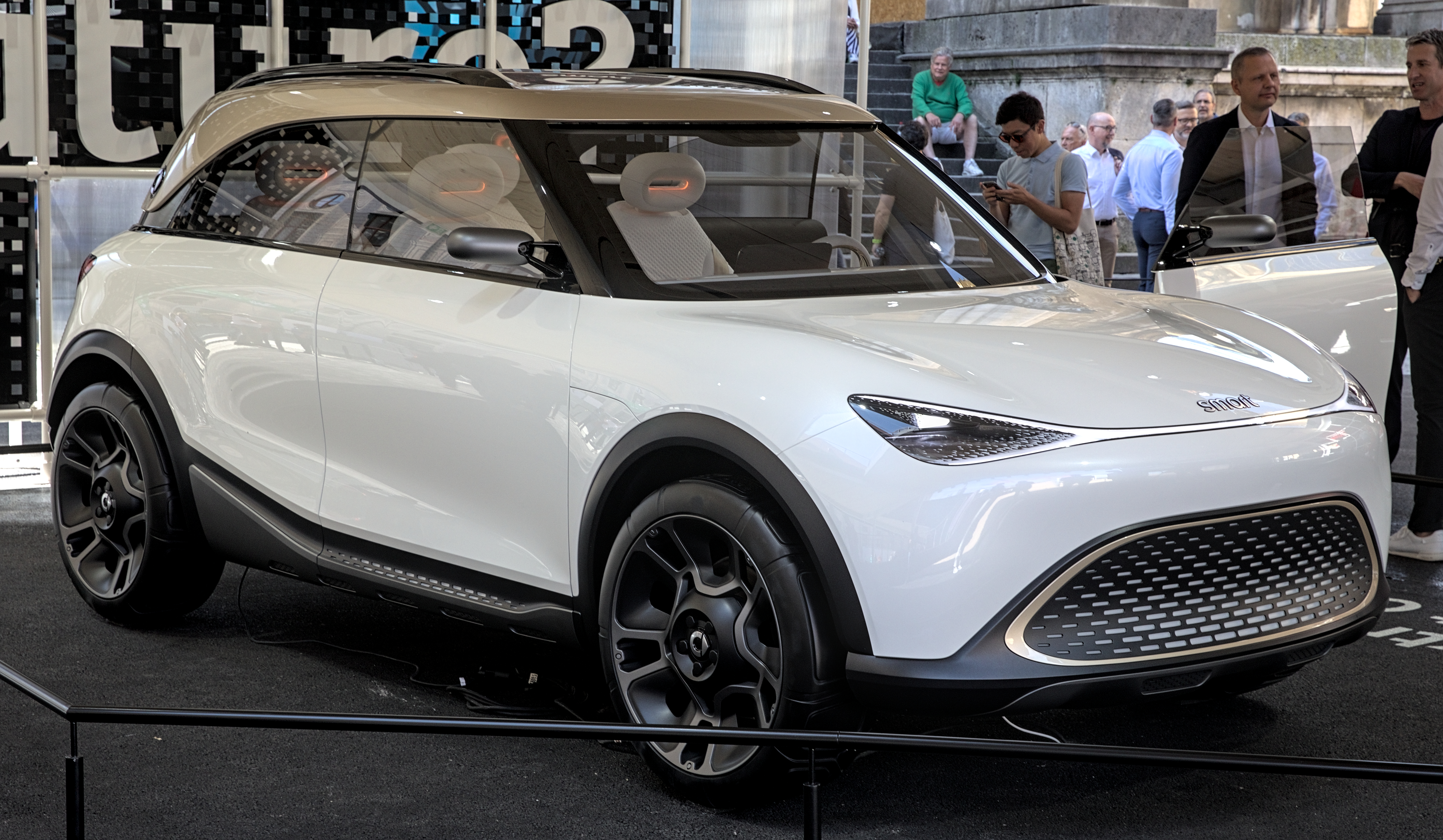
Smart Concept #1 Front View

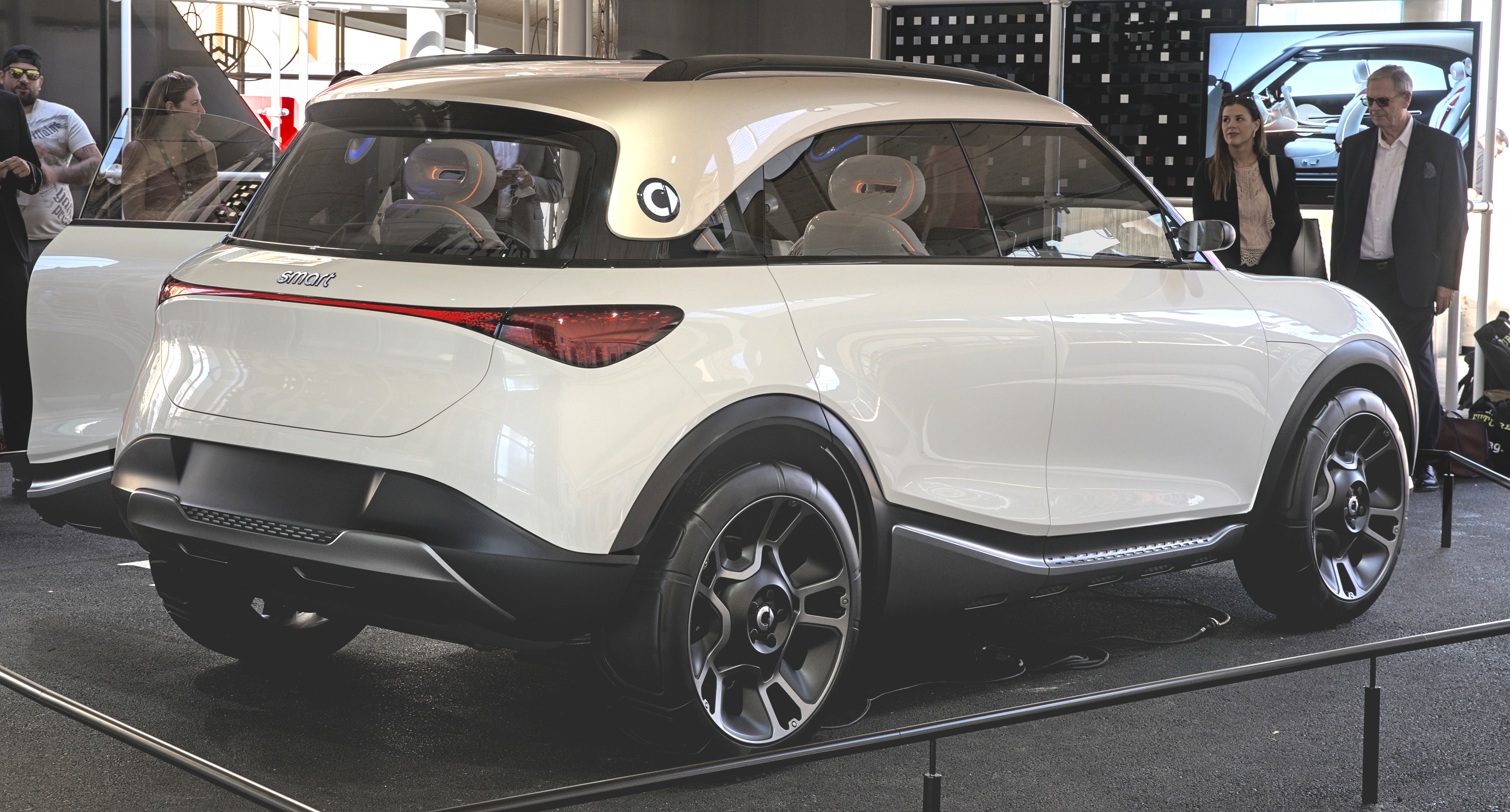
Smart Concept #1 Rear View

== First generation (2022) ==
The Smart #1 is equipped with a 12.8-inch touchscreen with a customizable user interface and ambient lighting. The vehicle offers connectivity through a dedicated app and an AI-based voice control system. It is powered by a 200 kW (268 hp; 272 PS) electric motor. Charging options include 22 kW AC charging and DC fast charging. Safety features include advanced driver assistance systems (ADAS) and a range of safety technologies.

Lines:

- Pure
- Pure+
- Pro
- Pro+
- Premium
- Pulse
- Brabus

=== #1 Brabus ===
A performance version with the Brabus branding was unveiled in August 2022. The edition offers a sportier driving experience with enhanced performance features. Exterior changes includes red accents on the bumpers, intakes, door sills, mirror caps, roof and improved brake calipers to handle the extra power, and a matte grey exterior finish and black emblems. It is powered by an additional 115 kW (156 PS; 154 hp) electric motor in the front to form an all-wheel drive layout, producing a total output of 315 kW (428 PS; 422 hp) with a claimed 0–100 km/h (0–62 mph) figure of 3.9 seconds. The range is decreased to 400 km (249 mi). It was released in Europe in September 2022.

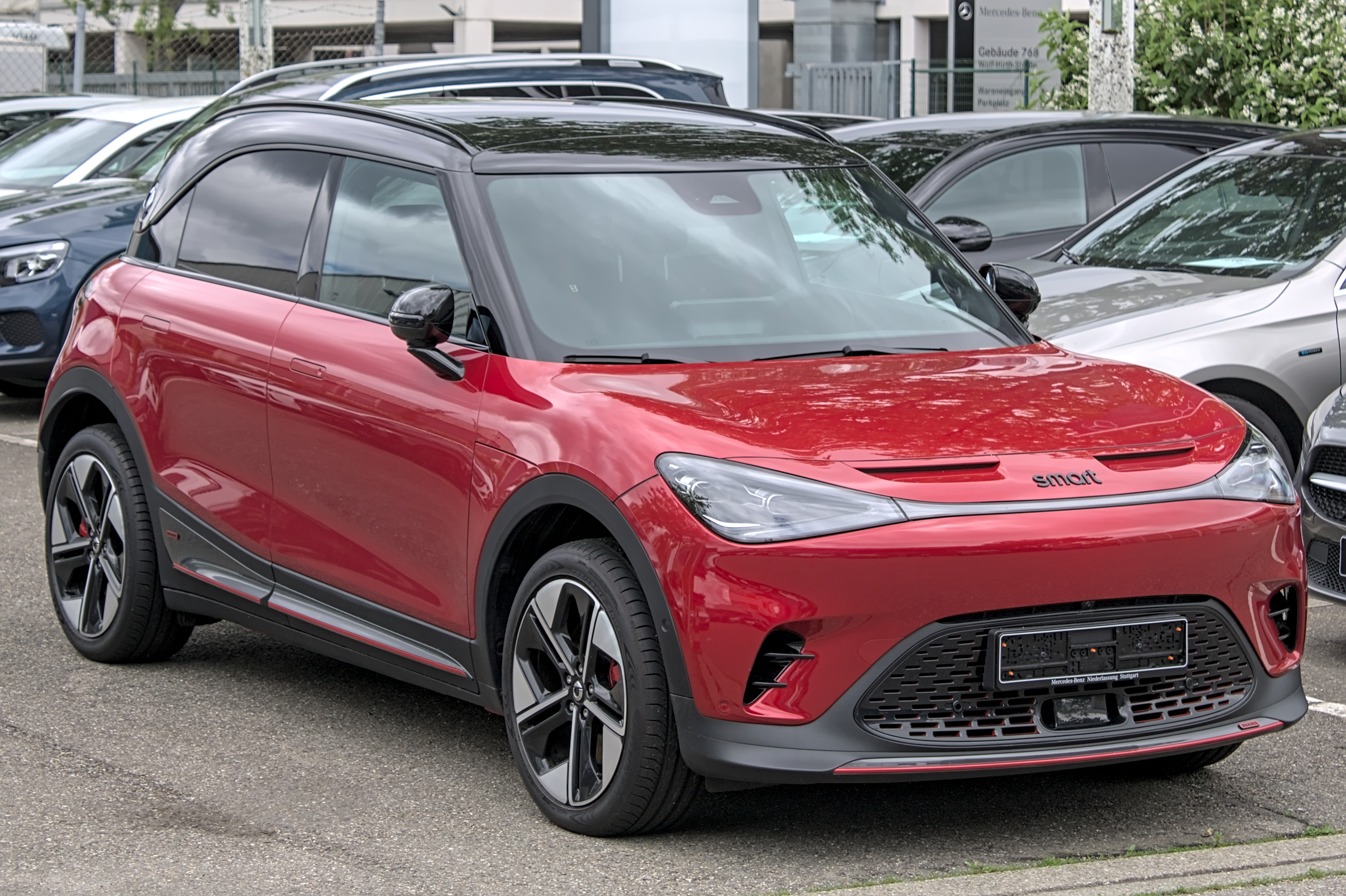
Smart #1 Brabus

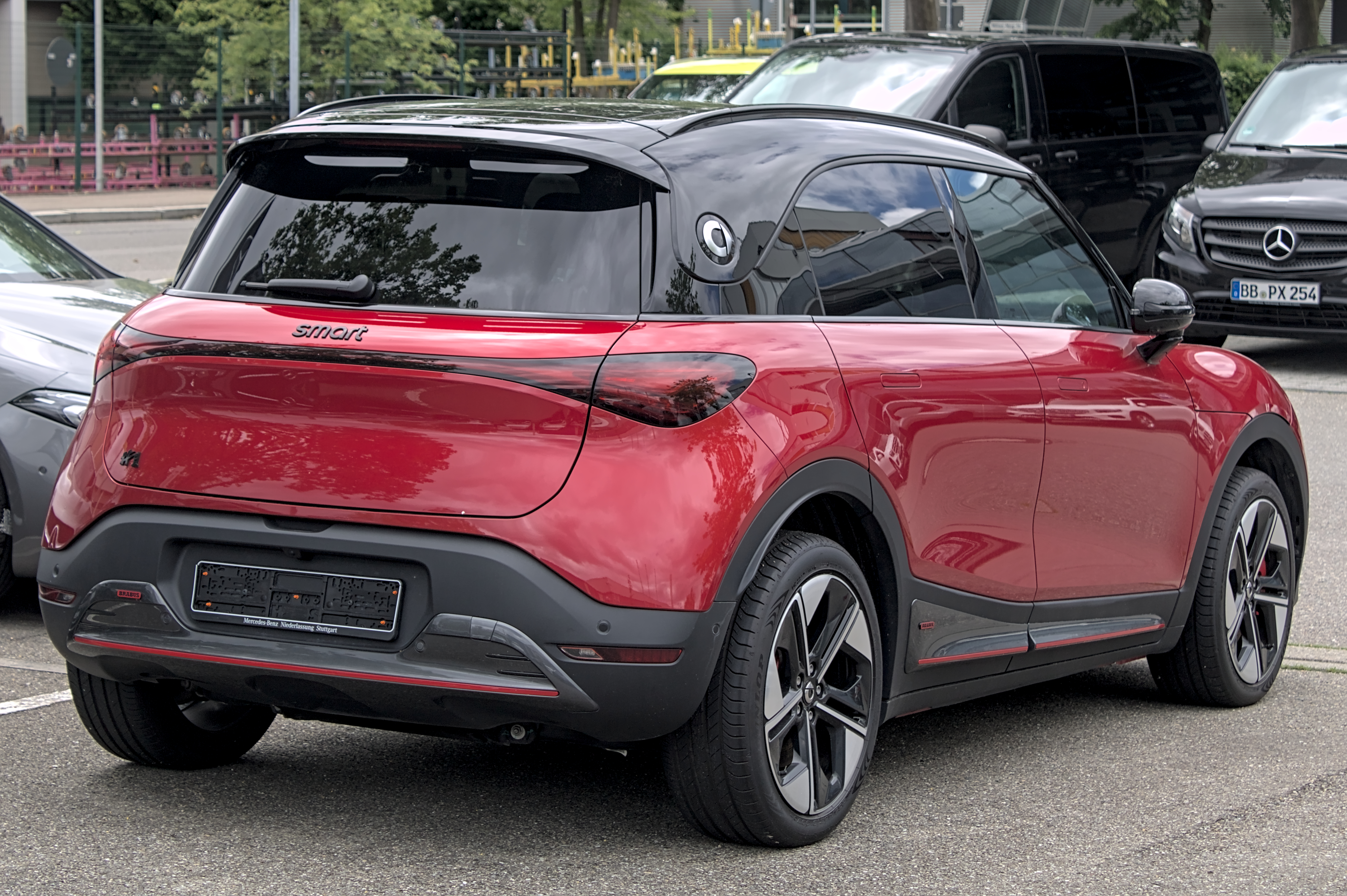
Rear view

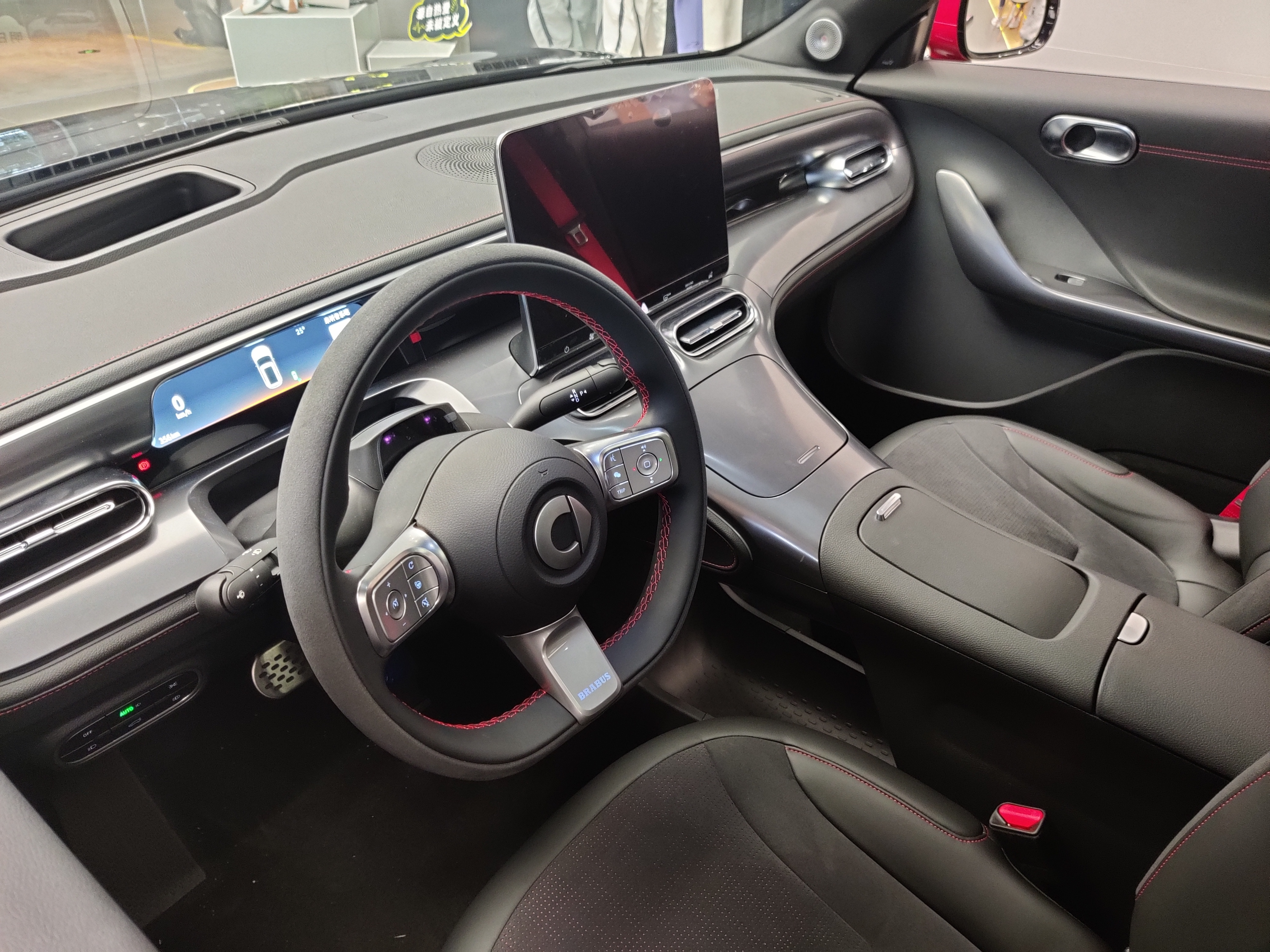
Interior

== Feature table ==
Feature	Pure	Pure+	Pro	Pro+	Pulse	Premium	BRABUS
Acceleration (0-100 km/h)	6.7 s				4.5 s	6.7 s	3.9 s
Range WLTP combined (km)	310 km (193 mi)	420 km (261 mi)	310 km (193 mi)	420 km (261 mi)	400 km (249 mi)	440 km (273 mi)	400 km (249 mi)
AC Charging Power up to	7.4 kW	22 kW	7.4 kW	22 kW			
DA Charging Power up to	130 kW	150 kW	130 kW	150 kW			
Drivetrain	RWD, 200 kW				AWD, 315 kW	RWD, 200 kW	AWD, 315 kW
Parking Sensors	4 Rear		8 Front and Rear		12 Front and Rear		
Parking Camera	-	-	360-degree				
Parking Assist	-				Automatic Parking Assist		
CyberSparks LED	With Automatic High Beam Assist					With Matrix Headlights and Adaptive High Beam	
Seats	Fabric		Man-made Leather		Duo Leather		Microfiber Suede Seats
Seats	-		Electrically Adjustable, Heated Front Seats				Electrically Adjustable, Heated and Ventilated Front Seats
Halo Roof	-		Panoramic Halo Roof				
Logo Projection	-				Courtesy Lights with Logo Projection		
Wireless Phone Charger	-		Wireless Phone Charger				
Central Display	12.8'' Screen with Navigation System						

== Safety ==
ANCAP test results Smart #1 all variants (2022, aligned with Euro NCAP)
Test	Points	%
Overall:	5 /5 stars	
Adult occupant:	36.62	96%
Child occupant:	43.06	87%
Pedestrian:	37.86	70%
Safety assist:	15.05	94%

Euro NCAP test results smart 1 (2022)
Test	Points	%
Overall:	5 /5 stars	
Adult occupant:	36.6	96%
Child occupant:	43.8	89%
Pedestrian:	38.9	71%
Safety assist:	14.1	88%

== Sales ==
Year	China
2023	33,256
2024	22,565
2025	20,762
