= Smart For-Us =

Smart For-us
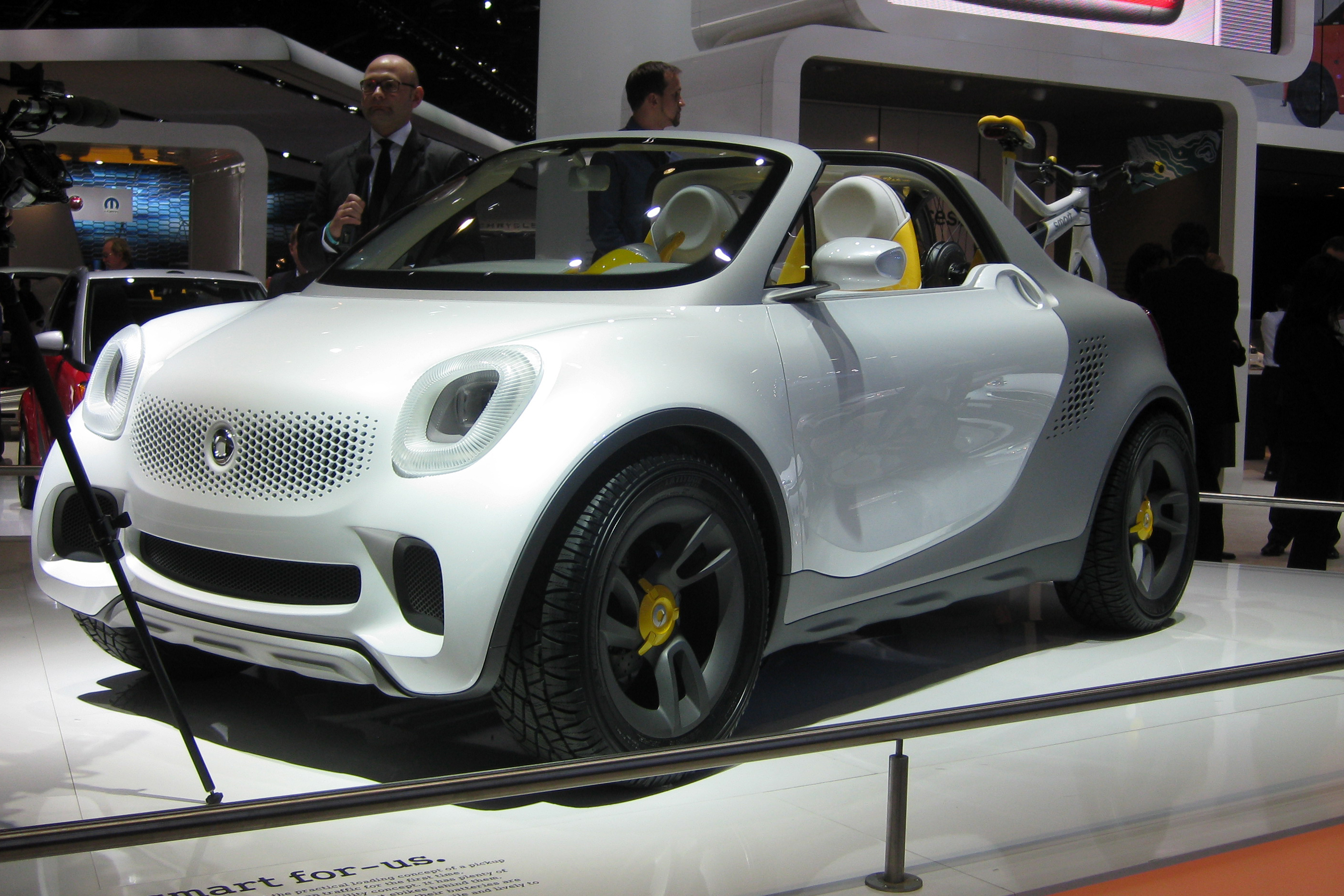
- Smart For-Us at NAIAS, 2012

Overview
- Manufacturer: Smart
- Model years: 2012

Body and chassis
- Related: Smart Forstars

Dimensions
- Length: 3457mm
- Width: 1506mm
- Height: 1701mm

The Smart For-Us (stylised as "smart for-us") is a concept car by Smart showcased in 2012 at the Detroit Motor Show. It is an electric urban pickup, with the body of a convertible and the rear bed of a small pickup. The rear bed is sized to fit two included electric bicycles, with an embedded port to charge them during the drive. The tail lights can open to reveal storage spaces.

The for-us has two seats, which are covered in a loose stretchy fabric to create a hammock-like feel. It is an automatic transmission vehicle. It has a smartphone holder at the top of the windscreen, which pairs with the rear view camera to replace a rear view mirror. The dashboard is not behind glass like a regular car, instead placing the dials individually behind the steering wheel. The tailgate is powered and retracts on its own to provide flat access to the rear bed.
