= Smart Crosstown =

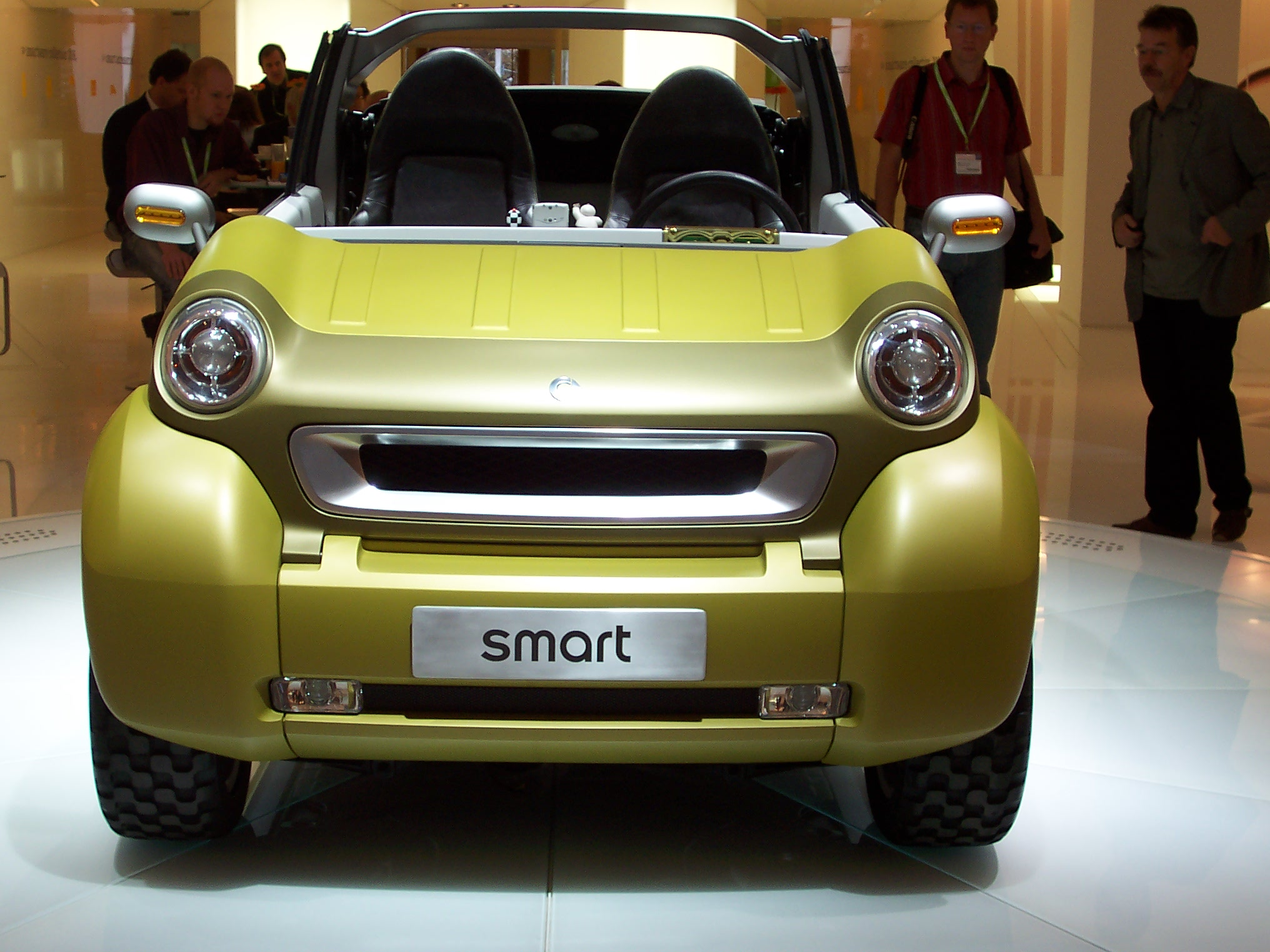

Overview
- Manufacturer: Daimler AG
- Production: 2005 (concept car only)

Body and chassis
- Related: Smart Fortwo

Powertrain
- Engine: 3-cylinder petrol/hybrid

Dimensions
- Wheelbase: 1,900 mm (74.8 in)
- Length: 2,680 mm (105.5 in)
- Width: 1,580 mm (62.2 in)
- Height: 1,580 mm (62.2 in)

Chronology
- Predecessor: Smart Crossblade

The Smart Crosstown is a concept car developed by the Smart division of Daimler AG and first shown to the public at the 2005 Frankfurt Motor Show.

It is a three-cylinder petrol/electric hybrid based on the Smart Fortwo. It also features a targa-style roof.

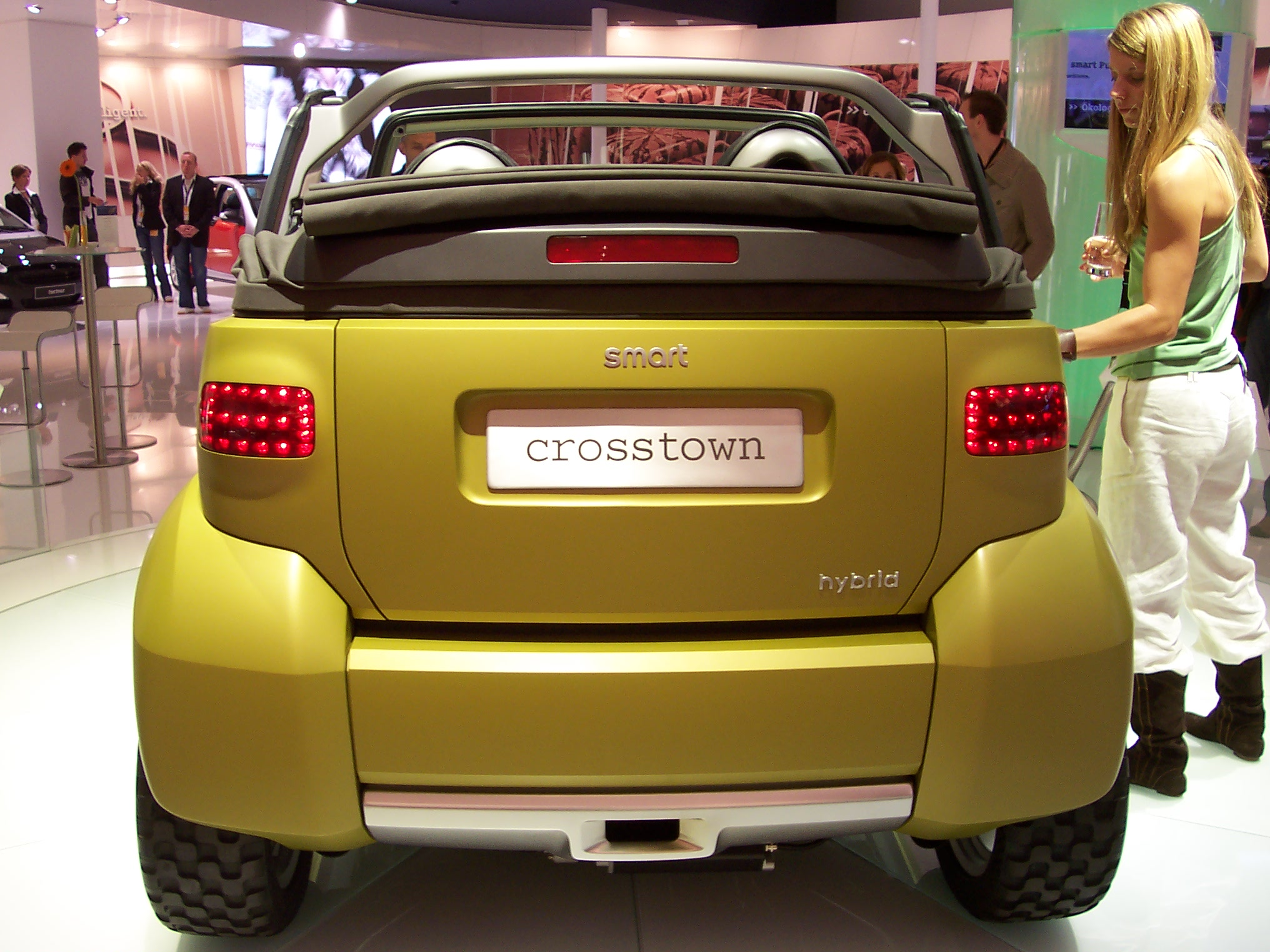
Crosstown rear

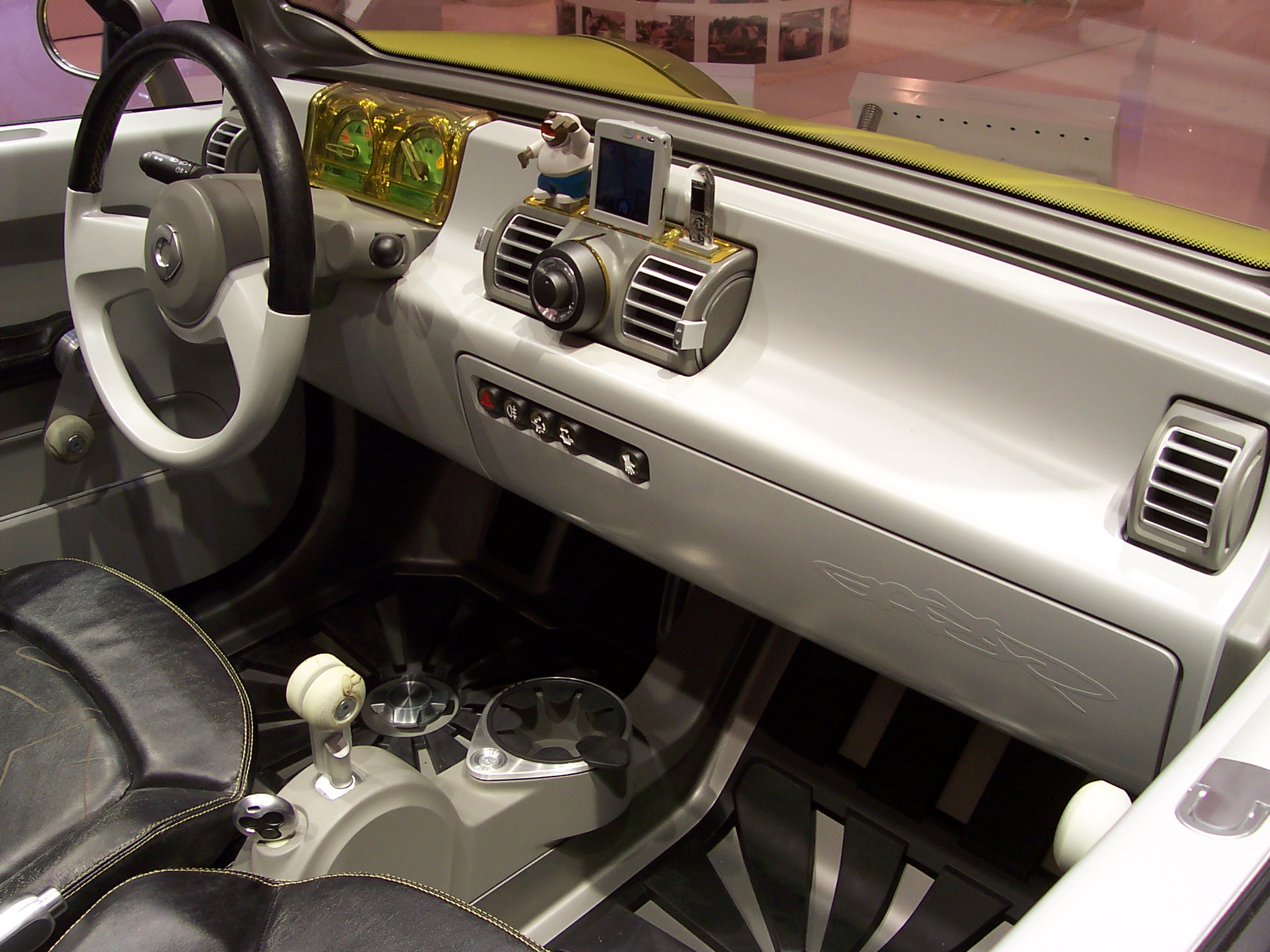
Crosstown dash

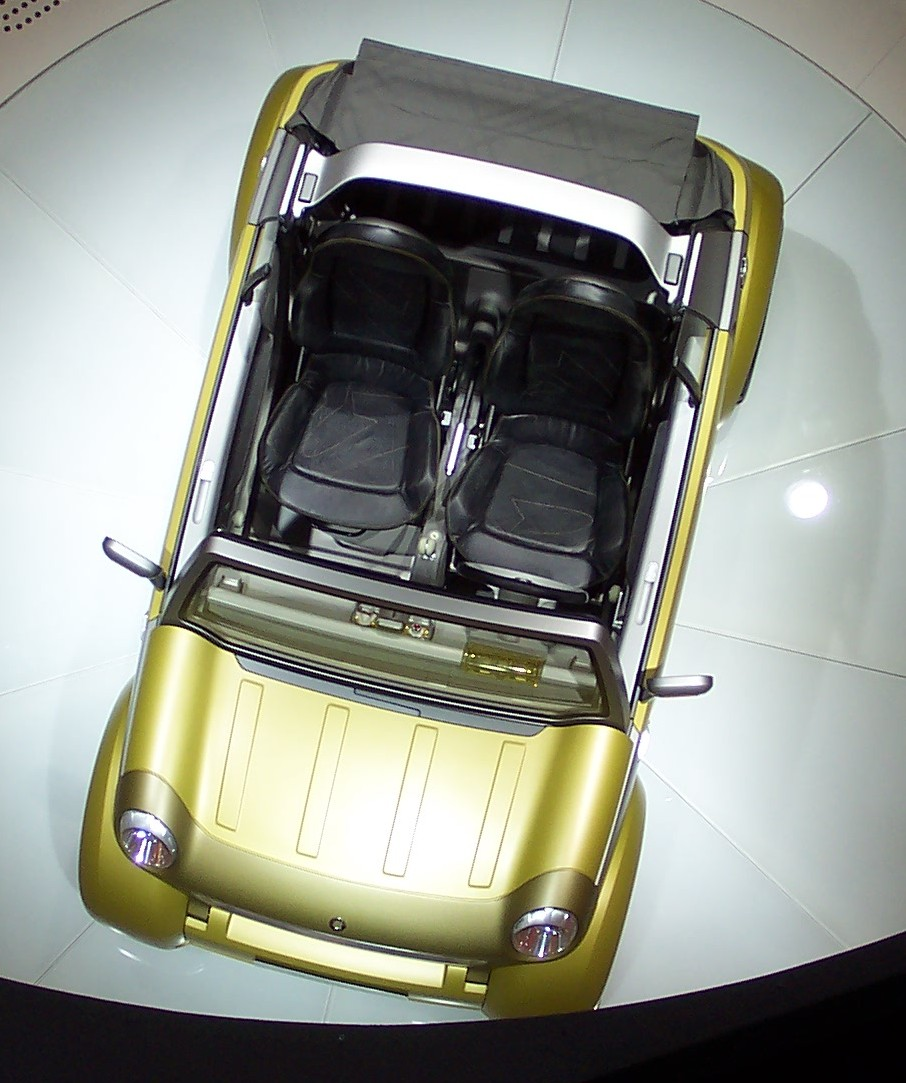
Crosstown top view
