= Smart (marque) =

German-Chinese automotive brand

Smart Automobile Co., Ltd.
- Type: Joint venture
- Industry: Automotive
- Founded: February 1994; 32 years ago (marque); 2019; 7 years ago (joint venture, China)
- Headquarters: Ningbo, China (Main Office); Stuttgart, Germany (European Office)
- Key people: Tong Xiangbei (global CEO); Dirk Adelmann (CEO of Smart Europe)
- Products: Electric vehicles
- Owners: Mercedes-Benz AG (50%); Zhejiang Geely Holding Group (50%)
- Subsidiaries: Smart Europe GmbH; Smart Automobile Sales Co., Ltd.

Chinese name
- Simplified Chinese: 智马达汽车有限公司
- Traditional Chinese: 智馬達汽車有限公司
Transcriptions
Standard Mandarin
- Hanyu Pinyin: Zhìmǎdá Qìchē Yǒuxiàn Gōngsī
- Website: smart.com

Smart (stylized in lowercase) is a Swiss born-German automotive marque established in 1994 and currently operating as Smart Automobile Co., Ltd., a joint venture formed in 2019 by Mercedes-Benz AG and Zhejiang Geely Holding Group, aimed at manufacturing Smart-badged cars in China to be marketed globally. The venture is headquartered in Ningbo.

Originally, Smart was known for producing microcars and subcompacts, primarily the Fortwo and Forfour, at Smartville in Hambach, Moselle, France and additionally at Renault's Revoz plant (Novo Mesto, Slovenia). Since its restructuring in 2019, the brand now produces small battery electric vehicles at a manufacturing plant in China, with distribution, marketing and aftersales activities in Europe handled by Smart Europe GmbH, which is headquartered in Stuttgart, Germany.

The marque was founded in 1994 by Micro Compact Car AG (MCC), a joint venture between SMH (makers of the Swatch brand of watches) and Daimler-Benz. MCC became a wholly owned subsidiary of Daimler-Benz in 1998, and was subsequently renamed MCC smart GmbH, then smart GmbH. smart GmbH was then absorbed by DaimlerChrysler (later Daimler AG) in 2006, making smart a marque within the Mercedes-Benz Cars division.

The name Smart derives from Swatch and Mercedes-Benz: "Swatch Mercedes ART".

== History ==
=== Origins ===
The design concept for the marque's automobiles began at Mercedes-Benz in the early 1970s to late 1980s. After brief backing by Volkswagen, the first model was released by Daimler-Benz in October 1998. Several variants on the original design have been introduced, with the original being the "City Coupé" that would be renamed the "ForTwo".

In late 1982, the CEO of SMH, Nicolas Hayek, began developing an idea for a new car using the same type of manufacturing strategies and personalization features used to popularize Swatch watches. He believed that the automotive industry had ignored a sector of potential customers who wanted a small and stylish compact city car. This idea soon became known as the "Swatchmobile". Hayek's private company Hayek Engineering AG began designing the new car for SMH, with seating for two and a hybrid drivetrain. The name Smart was coined by Manfred Gotta.

While design of the car was proceeding, Hayek feared existing manufacturers would feel threatened by the Swatchmobile. Thus, rather than directly competing, he preferred to cooperate with another company in the automotive industry. This would also relieve SMH of the cost burden in setting up a distribution network. Hayek approached several automotive manufacturers, and on 3 July 1991, he reached an agreement with Volkswagen to share development of the new project.

By 1993, Ferdinand Piëch had become CEO of Volkswagen, and he immediately sought to terminate the project with SMH. Volkswagen had already been working on their own "three-litre car": a car which would consume three litres of fuel per 100 kilometres of driving (the eventual Volkswagen Lupo 3L). Volkswagen's own concept was believed to be a better business proposition, featuring four seats and more cargo room.

Hayek had suspected that Piëch would seek to end the agreement with SMH upon his ascendancy to the CEO position; therefore, he discreetly began approaching other car companies with the Swatchmobile project. Rebuffed by BMW, Fiat, General Motors and Renault, he finally reached an informal agreement with Daimler-Benz AG, maker of Mercedes-Benz cars.

A deal was announced on 4 March 1994 at a press conference at Mercedes-Benz headquarters in Stuttgart, that the companies would join forces in founding Micro Compact Car AG (MCC). 49% of the initial capital of 50 million Swiss francs was provided by SMH and the remaining 51% by Daimler-Benz. The company consisted of two subsidiaries: MCC GmbH based in Renningen (a town 18 km west of Stuttgart), which would design the car, and the then-unnamed manufacturing plant. SMH Auto SA, owned by Hayek, would design a hybrid electric drive system for the car, while Hayek Engineering would audit the design and manufacturing.

The press conference also featured the debut of two concept cars: the "eco-sprinter" and "eco-speedster", styled by Mercedes-Benz's design studio in California. The cars were similar to the eventual Smart City-Coupé. No mention was made of the fact that SMH had no input in the design of these concepts, and they were badged as normal Mercedes-Benz vehicles.

By the end of April 1994, MCC had set up a head office in Biel/Bienne, Switzerland.

=== Pre-launch (1994–1997) ===
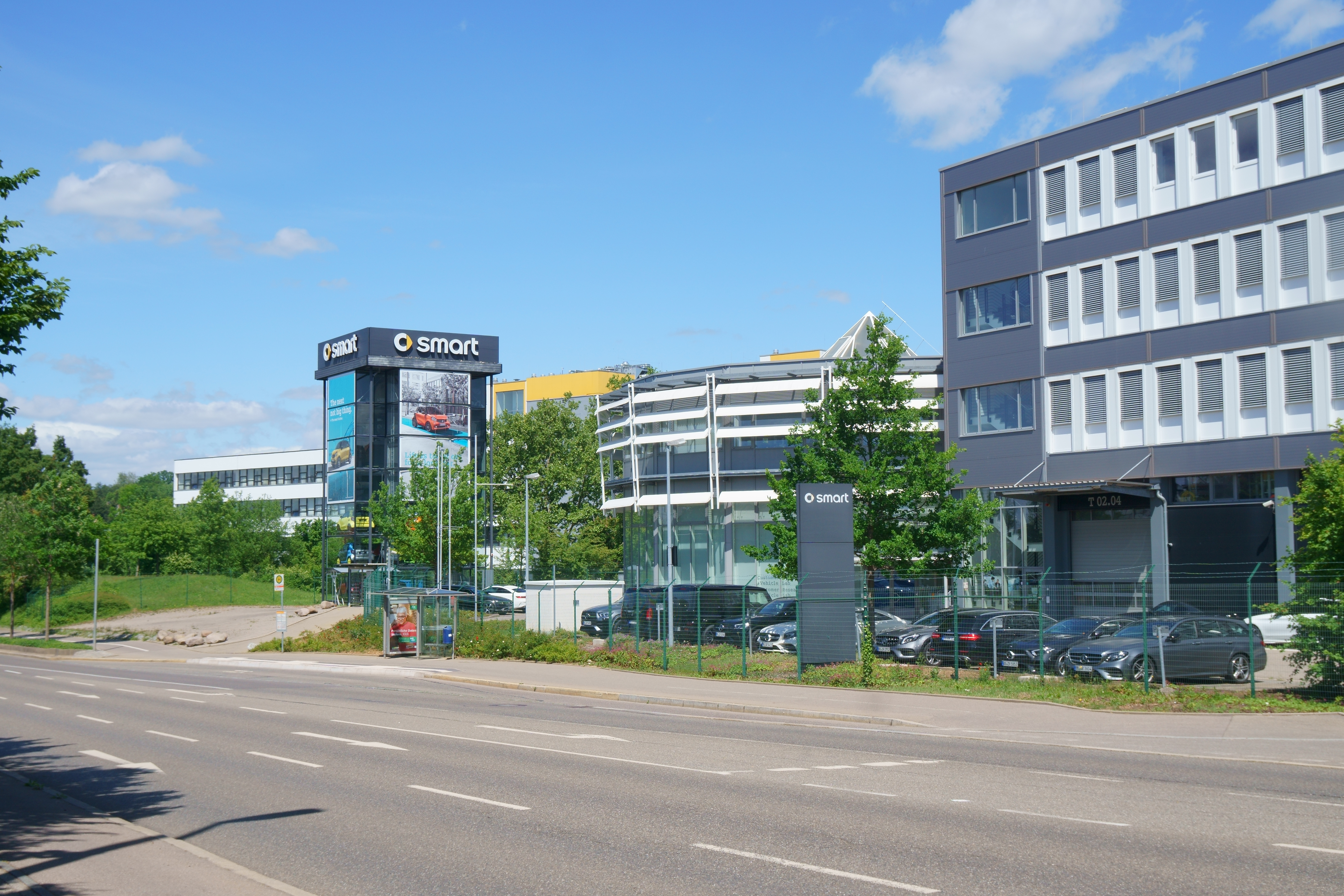
Former Smart offices in Böblingen

Three co-directors were immediately named to head the new company: designer and engineer Johann Tomforde and financial administrator Christoph Baubin from Daimler-Benz, and marketing manager Hans Jürg Schär, who spearheaded the original Swatch marketing campaigns in the mid-1980s. Tomforde had previously created concept sketches of an electric rear-engine, 2-seat, ultra-short economy car in 1972, which formed the basis for the 1981 Mercedes-Benz NAFA concept. Tomforde had been working on the Mercedes City Car (coincidentally abbreviated MCC) project at Daimler-Benz since 1990, which produced the eco-sprinter and eco-speedster concepts, as well as the Vision-A concept, which eventually became the Mercedes-Benz A-Class.

One of the first controversies at MCC was the name of the car itself. Nicolas Hayek insisted it retain Swatch in some way: "Swatchmobile", or "Swatch Car". Daimler-Benz refused and pushed for a neutral name. The final selection was Smart, an acronym that had been previously used internally by MCC for *S*watch *M*ercedes *Art*.

By May 1994, the co-directors had identified 74 potential sites for the assembly plant. The final site was announced on 20 December 1994: Hambach, France. The purpose-built factory quickly gained the nickname "Smartville".

In 1995, Tomforde devised a modular system of assembly for the car, insisting that suppliers design and assemble and even install their own modules onto the final car at the new plant, using their own employees and thus reducing the cost overhead for the parent companies and divesting MCC of the financial and legal liabilities for those parts. It also provided a fiscal framework whereby MCC could share the development costs with the suppliers, rather than having to fund the entire project themselves. MCC secured contracts with suppliers to design and supply almost all parts of the car: seats by Faurecia, interiors by VDO, chassis and door modules by Magna, door panels by Dynamit Nobel, and suspension by Krupp.

Despite offloading a substantial amount of the development on the suppliers, MCC required more capital. Recapitalization by Daimler-Benz increased their share of ownership in the company to 81% by 1996, leaving SMH with only the remaining 19%.

The assembly plant opened on 27 October 1997, with a ceremonial ribbon-cutting by then-French President Jacques Chirac and German Chancellor Helmut Kohl. Introduction of the new Smart City-Coupé was planned for March 1998; however, dynamic instability of the prototypes prompted Daimler-Benz to announce postponing the launch until October 1998. Johann Tomforde was replaced as chief engineer by Gerhard Fritz. Fritz lowered the centre of gravity, widened the track, stiffened the suspension, changed the steering, and added ballast weight to the front of the car in order to increase its stability in emergency avoidance manoeuvres (notably the Swedish "moose test").

The car launched successfully in nine European countries in October 1998, but the final design did not fulfill Hayek's expectations. Hayek pushed for a hybrid drivetrain, but the final product used a relatively conventional gasoline engine. Shortly afterward, Daimler-Benz bought out SMH's remaining stake in the company. MCC was now a wholly owned subsidiary of Daimler-Benz (which soon merged with Chrysler Corporation to become DaimlerChrysler). The office in Biel was shut down and operations were consolidated at the MCC GmbH design centre in Germany. On 1 January 1999, MCC GmbH changed its name to MCC smart GmbH, and by 2000, it dropped the last vestiges of the association with SMH, becoming smart GmbH.

=== Expansion (1998–2019) ===
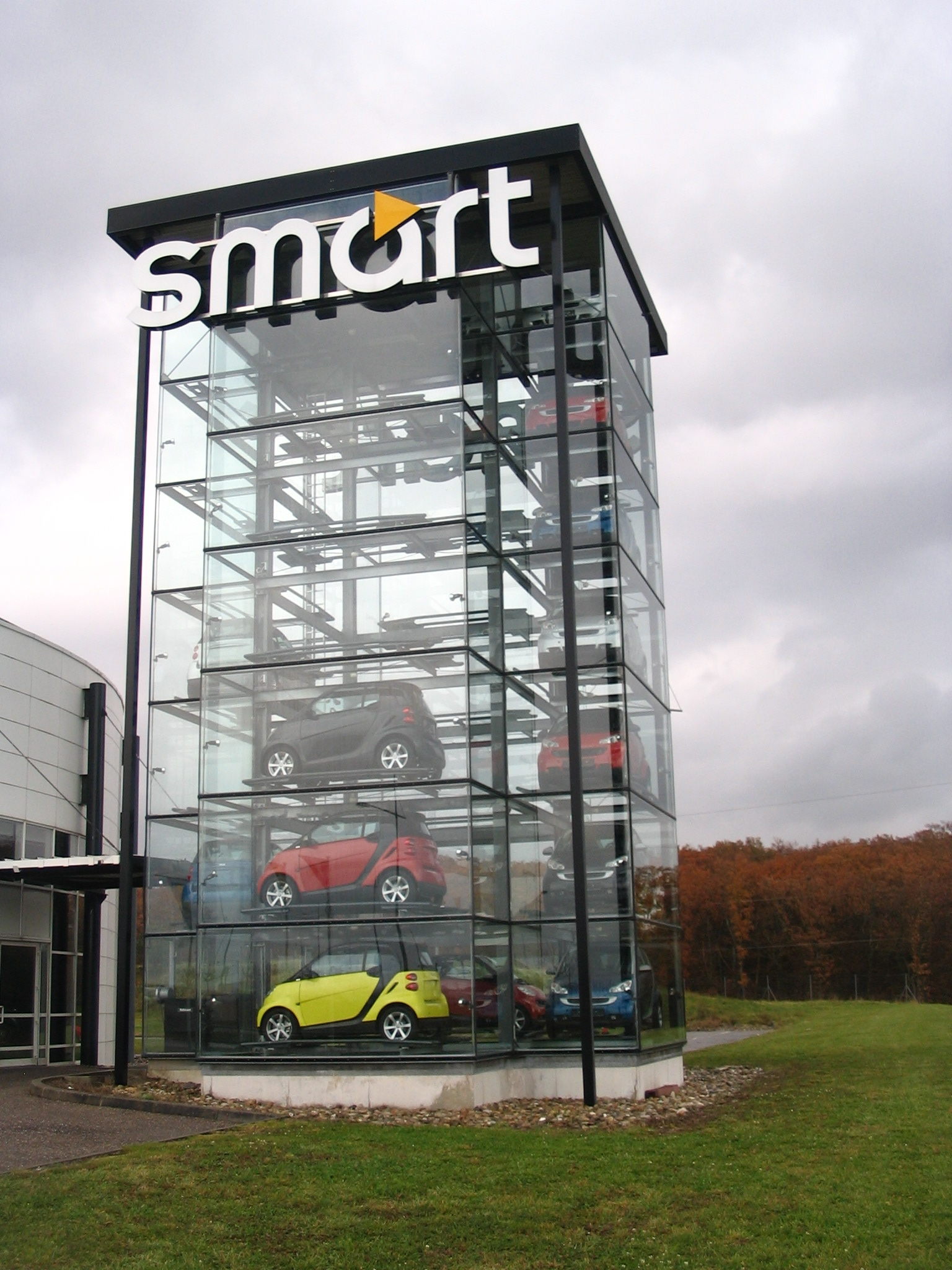
A Smart glass tower near Smartville, Hambach, in 2007

The model line was subsequently expanded to include the rear-engine, rear-drive Roadster and a four-door, four-seat supermini aptly named Forfour (the original City-Coupé was renamed Fortwo to fit the new naming scheme).

The expansion did not increase profits at the company; Smart GmbH lost nearly four billion euros from 2003 to 2006. Plans were enacted to increase the company's profitability and integrate its operations with Daimler (at the time DaimlerChrysler).

In 2005, Daimler decided against purchasing a 50% share in the Dutch NedCar plant used to manufacture the ForFour, ending its production. A planned SUV called Formore was terminated as the assembly plant in Brazil was being fitted with machines, and production of the Roadster was discontinued. In 2006, after dwindling sales and heavy financial losses, Smart GmbH was liquidated and its operations were absorbed by DaimlerChrysler directly.

Until April 2019, Smart operated under the Mercedes-Benz Cars division (of Daimler AG), offering the Fortwo coupé, the Fortwo convertible, and the Forfour hatchback.

=== Geely partnership (2019–present) ===
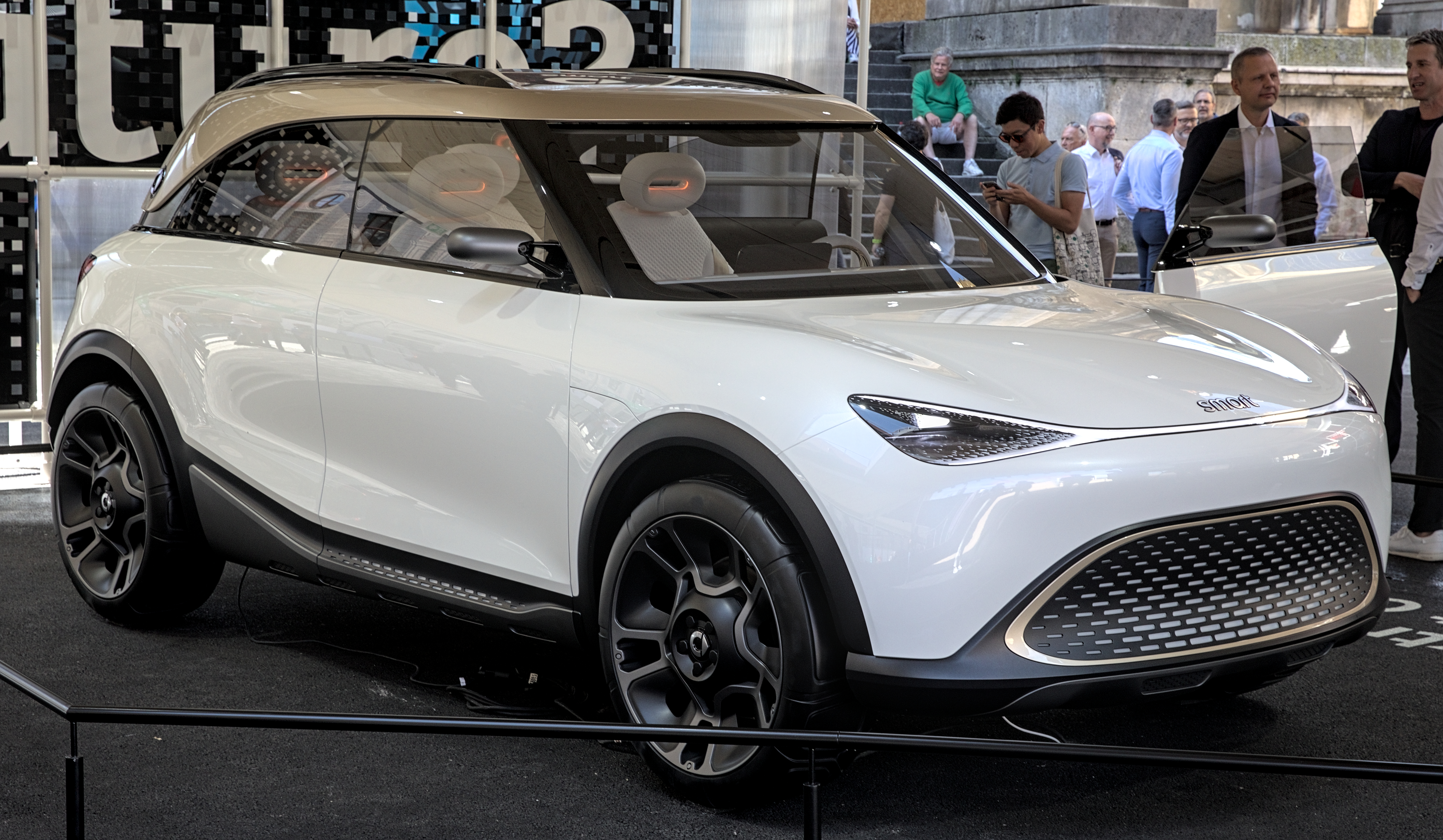
Smart Concept #1

In 2019, Daimler announced the establishment of a joint venture partnership with Chinese automaker Geely. The deal, worth a total of ¥5.4b RMB (about $830m USD), involves a new production plant to be built in China, which will start production on a new generation of Smart-branded vehicles. In 2021, the first concept of this partnership, called Concept #1, was unveiled at the Munich Motor Show. The concept vehicle is built on Geely's SEA platform and features design details of existing Smart models, including a panoramic glass roof, frameless suicide-style rear doors, and a large 12.8-inch (33 cm) touchscreen infotainment system.

== Leadership ==
- Andreas Renschler (1999–2004)
- Ulrich Walker (2005–2006)
- Annette Winkler (2010–2018)
- Katrin Adt (2018–2019)
- Tong Xiangbei (2020–present)

== Models ==
Apart from the original Smart Fortwo, a sporty Smart Roadster, a limited production of 2000 erstwhile concept Smart Crossblade and a supermini Smart Forfour were also offered. These have now been discontinued. There were also plans to introduce the French made cross-over based on the body of the ForFour and the AWD hardware of the Mercedes C-class with the name of Formore but industrialization of this was cancelled at the 11th hour (even as tooling was being installed in the assembly plant) due to unfavourable exchange rate swings and spending cutbacks driven by losses elsewhere within Smart.

=== Current ===
Picture	Model	Production
	Smart #1	2022–present
	Smart #3	2023–present
	Smart #5	2024–present
	Smart #6	2026–present
	Smart #2	to commence

=== Former ===
Picture	Model	Production
	Smart City-Coupé (C450) & City-Cabrio (from 2000) (A450)	1998–2000
	Smart Crossblade	2002
	Smart City-Coupé (C450) & City-Cabrio (renamed Fortwo in 2002) (A450)	2001–2007
	Smart K (Japan only)	2001–2004
	Smart Roadster Coupé (R452) Smart Roadster Cabrio (C452)	2003–2005
	Smart Forfour (W454)	2004–2006
	Smart Fortwo (C451) Smart Fortwo Cabrio (A451)	2007–2015
	Smart Fortwo Electric Drive (formerly known as EV) (C453) Smart Fortwo Cabrio Electric Drive (A453)	2008–2016 (2008–2011 in limited trials)
	Smart Fortwo (C453) Smart Fortwo Cabrio (A453)	2014–2019
	Smart Forfour (W453)	2014–2019
	Smart EQ Forfour	2017–2022
	Smart EQ Fortwo Smart EQ Fortwo Cabrio	2017–2024

=== Concept vehicles ===
- Tridion 4 (2001)
- Crosstown (2005)
- Formore (2005)
- Forspeed (2011)
- Forvision (2011)
- For-Us (2012)
- Forstars (2012)
- Fourjoy (2013)
- Concept #1 (2021)
- Concept #5 (2024)
- Concept #2 (2026)

== Marketing ==
=== Asia ===
==== Japan ====
First generation Smart models equipped with engine sizes smaller than 660 cc (40 cu in) fit into the Kei car category of cars in Japan, and are eligible for a range of lower taxes. Recent models with a larger engine do not meet the Kei qualifications. An official version of the Smart Fortwo called the Smart K has been released to fit the Kei car category. English musician Steve Appleton is featured in a Smart TV commercial, running in Japan during 2010.

==== China ====
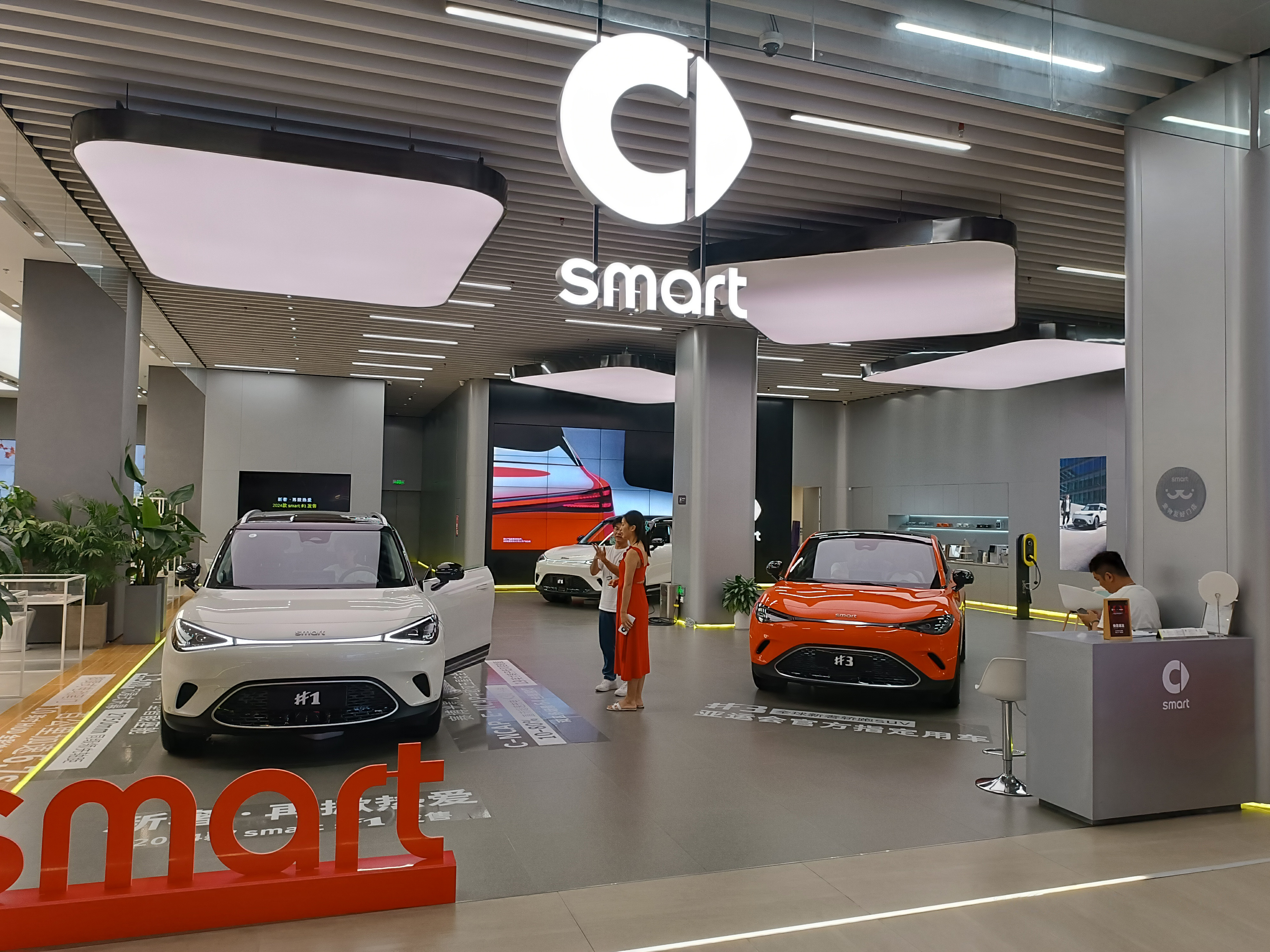
Smart showroom in Shenzhen

Smart was shown in April 2008, at the Beijing Auto Show. The Smart Fortwo started the pre-sales in October 2008 and the Smart vending machine road show in 12 cities from October 2008 to February 2009.

Smart is available in Hong Kong through an authorised dealer, Zung Fu Motors.

==== Indonesia ====
Since 29 November 2010, the Smart Fortwo has been available in Indonesia with PT. Mercedes-Benz Indonesia (MBI) as the authorised dealer. MBI originally offered three models: Pure Coupe, Passion Coupe, and Passion Cabriolet, for sale in Jakarta and Bali. Indonesia is also the first country in Southeast Asia to have the Smart Electric Drive, which has been lent to the Government of DKI Jakarta for a one-year period and can be extended for further indefinite period by a signed agreement between PT. Mercedes-Benz Indonesia, PT. Siemens Indonesia, and the Government of DKI Jakarta. The Smart ED will then serve as a pilot project to prove the effectivity of zero-emission car usage that can utilize alternative sources of energy. Smart is coming back in Indonesia after the MOU signing with Inchcape at the GIIAS 2024 and bringing Smart #3 Premium and Brabus.

=== North America ===
==== Canada ====
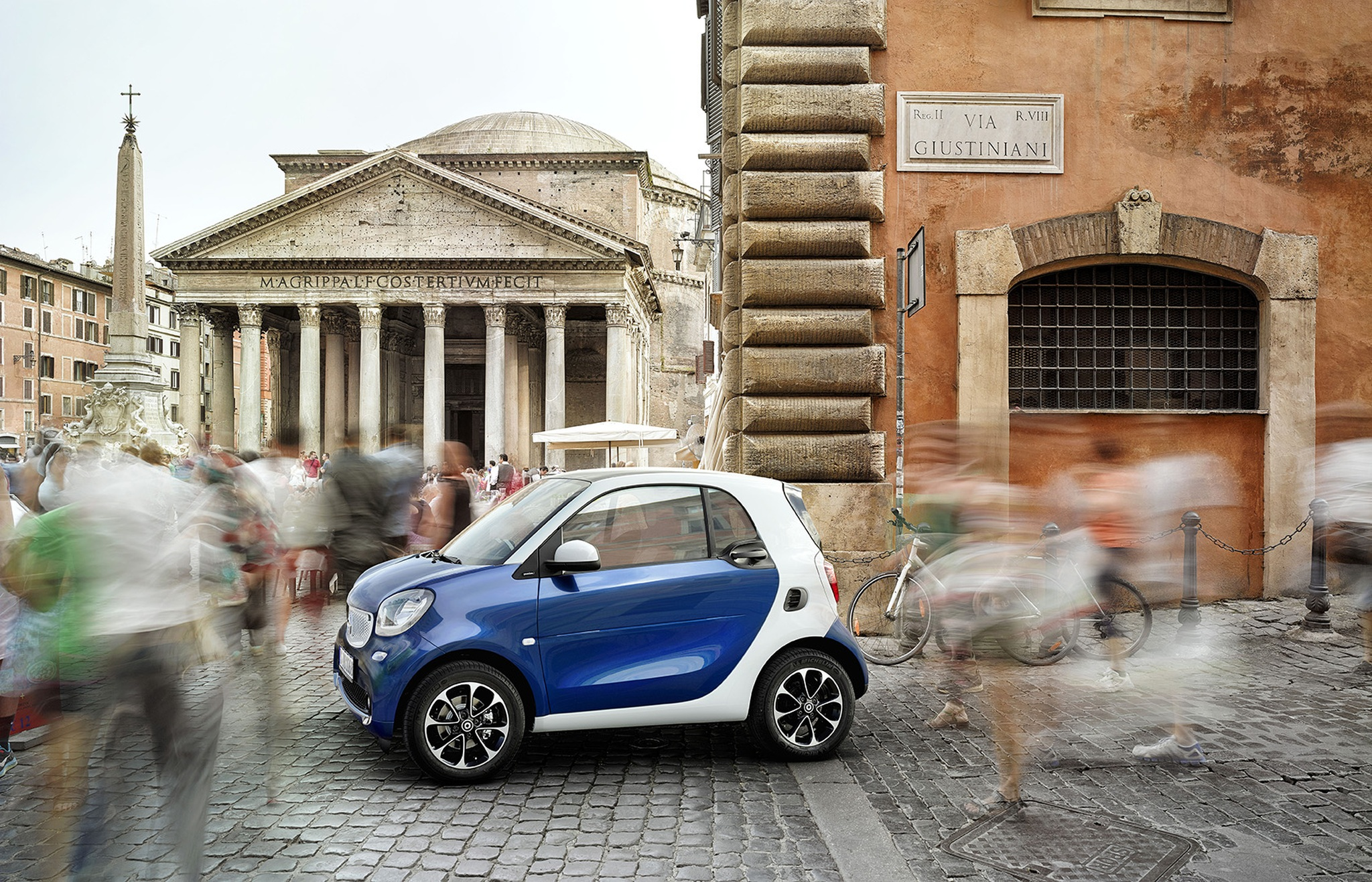
The Smart Fortwo

The Smart Fortwo was introduced in Canada in late 2004 and was sold through Mercedes-Benz dealers. Demand was initially heavy with up to 6-month waiting lists in major urban areas in the spring of 2005. The vehicle was especially popular for commuters, small car enthusiasts, people needing light delivery and service vehicles. Demand relaxed slightly in the second year on the market. Sales rebounded with the second generation. Canadian Smart cdis cannot be registered in some states in the US.

10,239 Smart Fortwo cdis had been sold in Canada by the first month of 2008. Just before the Type 450 ended production (after which the production had equaled 770,256 cars) Mercedes-Benz Canada built up stock of cdis to tide dealers over until the successor model 451 arrived at the end of 2007.

The Canadian version of the Type 450 Smart Fortwo cdi sold to 915 customers over three months in 2004; 4,080 were sold in 2005, and 3,023 in 2006. Virtually all the deliveries in 2004 and many of the deliveries in 2005 were to long-time Smart fans who had been waiting for their car for years, which largely accounts for the higher numbers. Through 2007, sales totaled about 2,200 units, with the last few cars being sold in the first month of 2008, when the new Type 451 was already on sale. The Smart's strongest sales performance ever in Canada was in April 2007, when more than 500 units were sold. Sales are strongest (per capita) in Western Canada, with Vancouver Island and Vancouver being especially hot markets.

The 2008-2011 (North America) Smart Fortwo Type 451 was totally redesigned, with a 70-horsepower (71 PS; 52 kW) naturally aspirated Mitsubishi-sourced gasoline engine of 999 cc (61.0 cu in) for North America, up from the 799 cc (48.8 cu in) cdi diesel, with the attendant loss of fuel economy. Smart decided not to import the cdi version of the 451, now with 55 DIN HP, although this decision has led to criticism that the new Smart does not get the fuel economy that many would expect from such a small car. The 799 cc, far more fuel efficient diesel is sold in Europe and some other markets.

The Brabus Tailor-Made program is not well advertised in Canada, but at least 16 Tailor-Made cars have been produced to Canadian specification. These vehicles are sent to the Brabus factory in Bottrop, Germany, where the standard ex-works cars are stripped to the shell and repainted/retrimmed to suit individual customers' tastes. The first four are the Brabus Canada 1; three in bright red (including the tridion, two cabriolets and one coupé) and one in all white (a cabriolet). Aside from the special paint, all had every Brabus part fitted to the body and interior, and the seats, door panels and dashboards were trimmed in black Nappa leather and Alcantara. Three of these cars are in British Columbia and #1-of-1, the Concept vehicle used at Canadian International Auto Shows (a red cabrio with silver alloys), is now in London, Ontario. The next Brabus tailor made Canadian car was a one-off all orange 451 made for a customer in Vancouver. The other ten were all ordered by Mercedes-Benz Canada as the special "edit10n" of the Canadian Brabus 451 (with only 70 HP), painted in metallic dark grey with an orange Nappe leather interior. There is also at least one BoConcept 451 built to Canadian standards.

In 2009, the Government of Canada acquired the European Smart mhd (micro hybrid drive) through partnership with Mercedes-Benz Canada. The project was administered by the ecoTECHNOLOGY for Vehicles(eTV) program within Transport Canada. Goals were to identify the benefits of the start-stop system equipped on the vehicle and how to accelerate the penetration of this technology throughout Canada. See Smart mhd Test Results Report.

On 30 April 2019 Daimler announced that 2019 would be the last year for Canada and will continue to support owners going forward.

==== United States ====
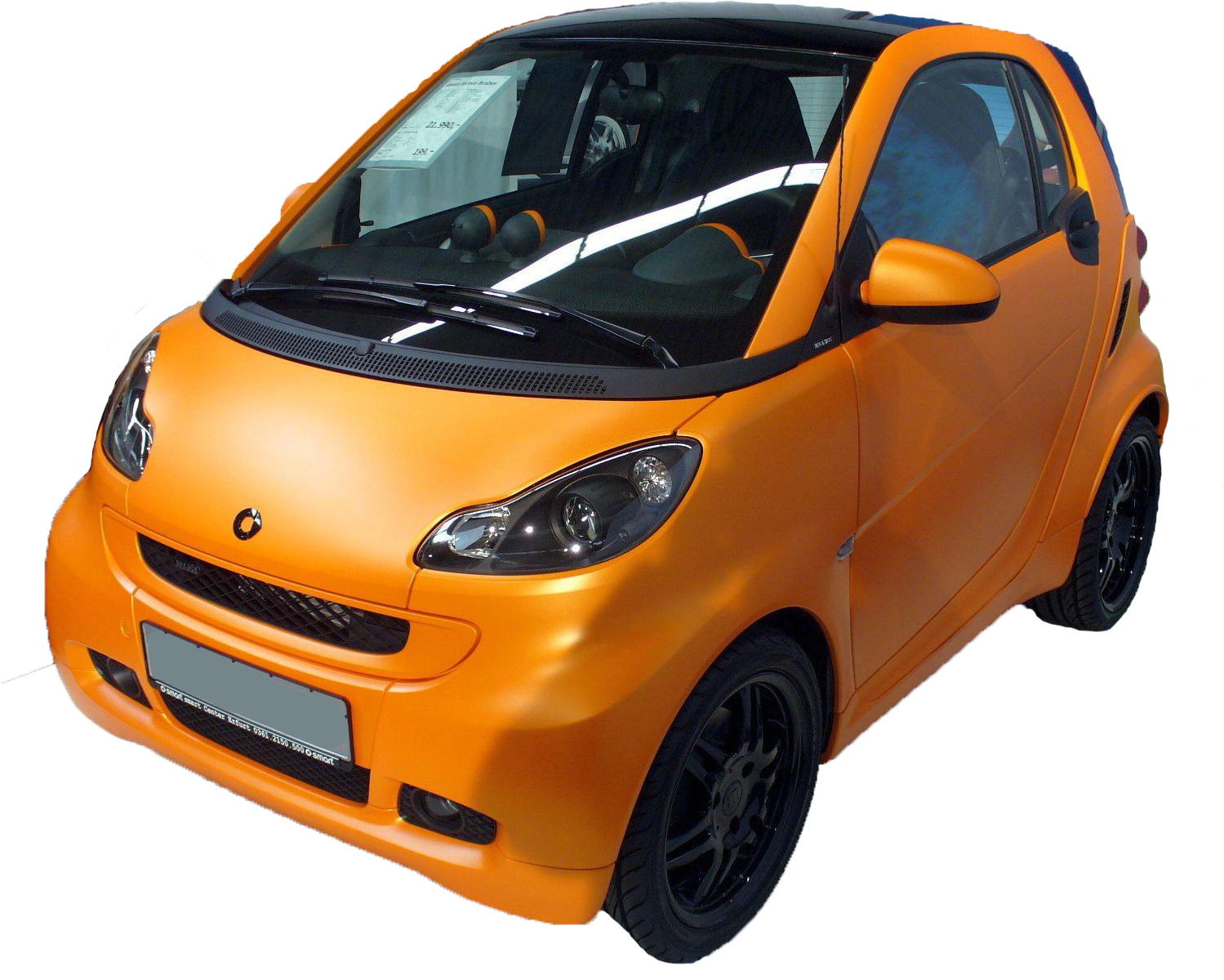
smart Fortwo (2nd generation)

Before 2008, Smart cars were only available in the United States as "grey market" imports, such as ZAP. U.S. federal regulations allow certain grey market importing in large quantities, provided the vehicles are modified and tested to conform to U.S. safety and emissions regulations. Smarts were imported into the United States by "The Defiance Company LLC", modified by G&K Automotive Conversion in Santa Ana, California, and distributed and sold by independent dealerships which were not affiliated with Mercedes. U.S. regulations did not permit the purchase and import of used Smart CDi vehicles from Canada, as the diesel powered Canadian Smarts did not meet American emissions regulations.

In June 2006, DaimlerChrysler confirmed that Smart would be officially launched in the United States in the first quarter of 2008. The cars were offered through a dealership holding company Penske Automotive Group, which created a new U.S. dealership network for the brand under the name Smart USA. Initially, an updated gasoline powered Fortwo was offered, starting around US$12,000. The new model made its debut at European auto shows in November 2006.

A Forbes article has been critical of the stated reasons that Daimler-Chrysler gave for introducing the car in the United States. The Smart Fortwo may have claimed to be the most fuel-efficient fully gasoline-engined car for sale in the U.S., but it actually lags behind the 4-door Mitsubishi Mirage and 2-door Scion iQ (combined 40 mpg_{‑US} (5.9 L/100 km; 48 mpg_{‑imp}) and 37 mpg_{‑US} (6.4 L/100 km; 44 mpg_{‑imp}), respectively). According to the EPA, the Smart's fuel efficiency is lower than the fuel efficiency of some hybrids, including the Ford Fusion, the Toyota Prius, the Honda Civic Hybrid, and the two-seat Honda Insight, which achieve 41 mpg_{‑US} (5.7 L/100 km; 49 mpg_{‑imp})/36 mpg_{‑US} (6.5 L/100 km; 43 mpg_{‑imp}), 51 mpg_{‑US} (4.6 L/100 km; 61 mpg_{‑imp})/48 mpg_{‑US} (4.9 L/100 km; 58 mpg_{‑imp}), 40 mpg_{‑US} (5.9 L/100 km; 48 mpg_{‑imp})/43 mpg_{‑US} (5.5 L/100 km; 52 mpg_{‑imp}), and 40 mpg_{‑US} (5.9 L/100 km; 48 mpg_{‑imp})/43 mpg_{‑US} (5.5 L/100 km; 52 mpg_{‑imp}) (city/highway) respectively while the Smart achieves 33 mpg_{‑US} (7.1 L/100 km; 40 mpg_{‑imp}) city and 41 mpg_{‑US} (5.7 L/100 km; 49 mpg_{‑imp}) highway. The Smart Fortwo is the most efficient car at its pricepoint, since it costs about half as much as a hybrid in the U.S.

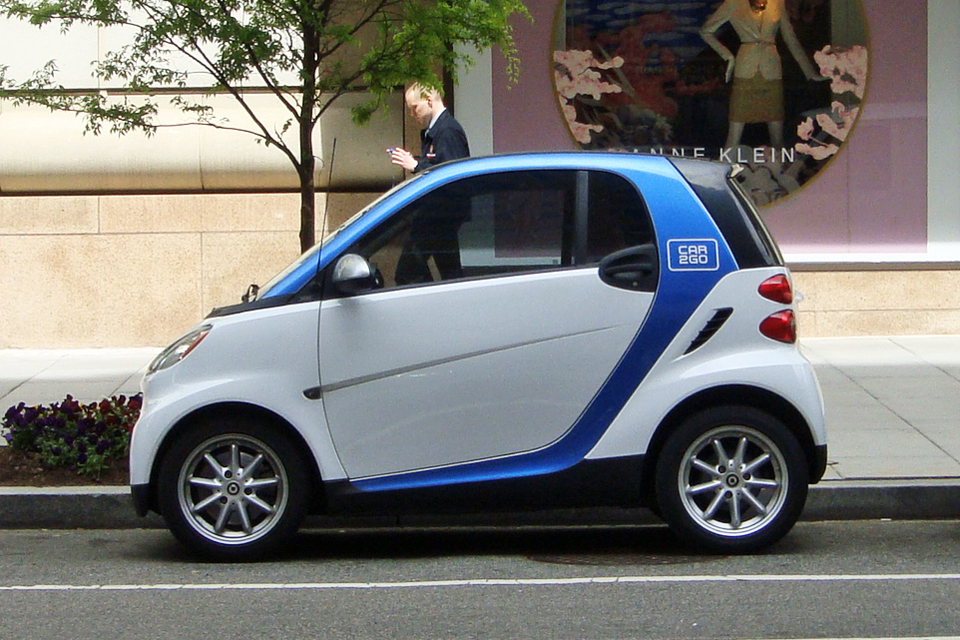
Car2Go carsharing Smart fortwo (2nd generation)

The Fortwo has received much attention in the U.S. In its April 2008 issue, Men's Vogue raised the question, "in a nation where your supersized car is your castle, is the Smart too mini for a man?".

To obtain a Smart Fortwo originally required obtaining a "reservation" costing $99 through a dealer or over the internet. The waiting time in January 2009 was approximately 12 months; by July 2009, there was no wait to obtain a vehicle and dealers had them in stock for immediate delivery.

On 25 January 2010 Smart USA began its first lease program in the U.S. market for Smart Fortwo models. The program was scheduled to last until 28 February 2010 but has been extended indefinitely despite lack of leasing sales.

Penske Automotive Group announced plans on 14 February 2011 to relinquish distribution of the Smart Fortwo under Smart USA, to Mercedes-Benz USA. In 2011, Smart USA offered four versions of their Fortwo model. These models include the following: cabriolet, the high-cost convertible version; passion, the mid-cost moonroof version; pure, the low-cost basic version; and electric drive, the electric version.

On 1 July 2011 Mercedes-Benz USA took over the distribution, sales and marketing of the Smart brand from Penske Automotive Group. Smart is owned and produced by Mercedes' parent, Daimler AG.

The third generation Smart Fortwo coupe (C453) was introduced in the United States as a 2016 model in September 2015. The fortwo cabrio (A453) model arrived at American dealerships in 2016 as a 2017 model, and was sold alongside the fortwo coupe. In February 2017, smart USA announced that gasoline models would be discontinued after the 2017 model year, and the brand would focus on an all-electric strategy beginning for the 2018 model year. Both coupe and cabrio models will remain on sale as battery-electric vehicles, with the fortwo cabrio electric drive being offered as the only electric convertible for sale in the United States.

The year 2018 marked 10 years of Smart sales in the U.S., and the brand offered a limited-edition 10th anniversary edition fortwo coupe electric drive to celebrate. The edition was announced in January 2018, and shown at the 2018 North American International Auto Show.

Smart exited the U.S. market after the 2019 model year due to slow sales and the high cost of homologating the Fortwo for the U.S.

==== Mexico ====
Smart offers the hardtop and convertible models of the Fortwo coupé in Mexico.

The Smart Fortwo was introduced in 2003, and were sold in department stores Sanborns and Liverpool. Later Mercedes-Benz dealers started to offer the car. Currently Smart cars are still offered in the country, with only the Fortwo model available.

=== South America ===
==== Argentina ====
In Argentina, the Fortwo has been for sale since 2010 and models (Fortwo Cabrio and Fortwo Coupé) can be bought in dealerships located in the Puerto Madero neighborhood of Buenos Aires.

==== Brazil ====
In Brazil, the Fortwo has been for sale since 2009 and models (Fortwo Cabrio turbo, Fortwo Coupé turbo and Fortwo Coupé MHD) can be bought in some Smart and/or Mercedes-Benz dealerships in São Paulo, Rio de Janeiro, Belo Horizonte and Porto Alegre cities. The electric, Brabus and Forfour versions are not available for the Brazilian market.

Smart was launched in Brazil in 2009, but stopped being sold in 2016.

Eventually, Smart is planning a return to Brazil by 2026, with electric cars.

=== Oceania ===
==== Australia ====
Smart models were for sale in Australia from 2003 to 2015. It was announced in March 2015 that the Smart brand would be withdrawn from Australia due to poor sales, however, it was announced in May 2024 that the Smart brand would re-enter the Australian market.

=== Europe ===
In 2004, the brand was launched in Malta, Norway and Romania.

==== United Kingdom ====
Launched in the United Kingdom in 2000, the current range features the Smart Fortwo convertible, and Smart Fortwo Coupé. Smart is available in the UK through Mercedes-Benz retailers.

The UK is host to a number of annual events, both official and unofficial, including the Smart Festival, held annually at Mercedes-Benz World in Weybridge, near historic Brooklands - the world's first purpose-built motor racing circuit.

==== Russia ====
The Smart brand debuted in the Russian market in 2012 with the Fortwo model only.

== Safety ==
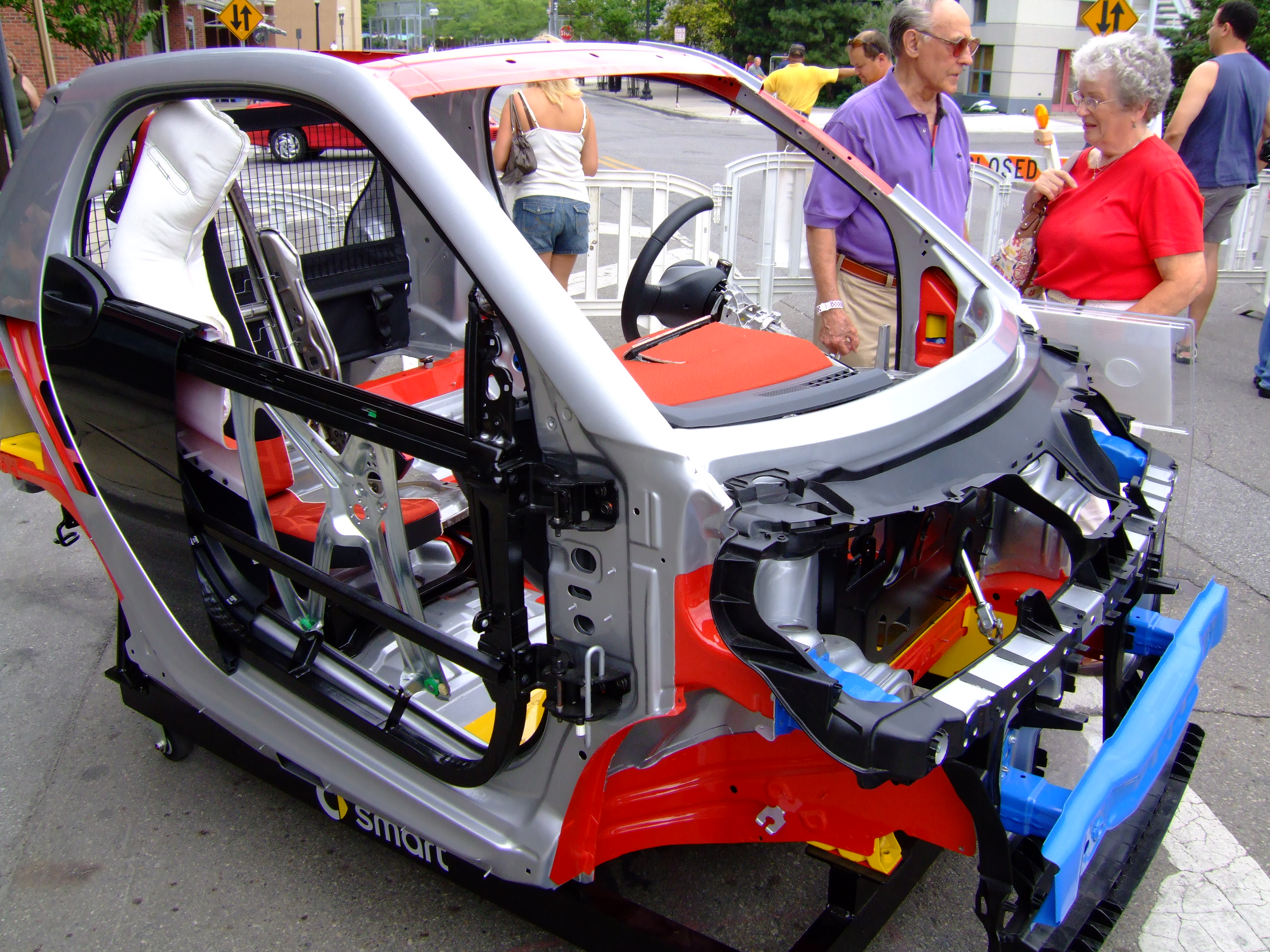
Cutaway showing structure of the smart Fortwo

The Smart Fortwo uses a very small front crumple zone. The second generation Smart Fortwo has been awarded 4 out of 5 stars in the Euro NCAP Adult Occupant Protection and 2 out of 4 stars in the Pedestrian protection test, but was not tested for Child Occupant Protection, as it has no rear seats. The original Smart was awarded 3 out of 5 stars for Adult Occupant Protection. In American tests using a five-star rating, Smart cars received a four-star safety rating for the driver from a front impact, and a five-star safety rating for the driver for a side impact. It also received "Good" ratings for front and side crash protection in Insurance Institute for Highway Safety (IIHS) tests. However, in an April 2009 40-mile-per-hour (64 km/h) frontal offset crash test between a Fortwo and a Mercedes C-Class, "the Smart went air-borne and turned around 450 degrees" causing "extensive intrusion into the space around the dummy from head to feet". The IIHS rated the Smart Fortwo "Poor," noting that "Multiple injuries, including to the head, would be likely for a real-world driver of a smart in a similar collision."

The main structure of the car is a stiff structure, marketed as the Tridion Safety Cell, designed to activate the crumple zones of a colliding vehicle. This design creates a safety cell around the passengers, according to the manufacturer.

== See also ==
- Baojun E200
- Renault Twizy
- Toyota iQ
