= Smart Formore =

Overview
- Manufacturer: Smart GmbH
- Production: Not produced

Body and chassis
- Class: Crossover SUV / Mini SUV
- Related: Mercedes-Benz GLK-Class

The Smart Formore was a small all-wheel drive SUV, riding on the same platform as the Mercedes-Benz C-Class. The architecture would be shared with the Mercedes-Benz GLK-Class, an SUV that is smaller than the M-Class. Power would have ranged from a 1.8 L straight-4 to a 3.0 L V6, including Diesel versions. Production was to have been carried out at DaimlerChrysler's factory in Juiz de Fora, Brazil, rather than the French Smartville factory.

The Formore was to be Smart's first official entry in the United States market as a Mini SUV that seats 4–5. However, DaimlerChrysler went ahead with a limited entry into the market, with just the Fortwo, essentially in urban areas. Development of the Formore has been halted since April 2005, due to DaimlerChrysler's monetary concerns (the Smart brand had yet to make a profit after eight years in operation, and the Formore was costing more money to develop than anticipated).

A concept version was to be unveiled at the 2005 Frankfurt Auto Show, but the event was cancelled. In 2009, the concept was found in a Mercedes-Benz storage facility in Germany, seemingly parked next to a prototype production version. The concept was officially revealed for the first time in 2019 as part of a Smart concept car photo shoot.
