= M160 =

M160 may refer to:

- M-160 (Michigan highway), a state highway in Michigan
- M-160 mortar, a Soviet heavy mortar
- Mercedes-Benz M160 engine, an automobile engine
- M160, a version of the 7.62×51mm NATO rifle cartridge
- Ecofly M160, a German aircraft engine
- Beyerdynamic M 160, a German ribbon microphone introduced in 1957
