= Smart Roadster =

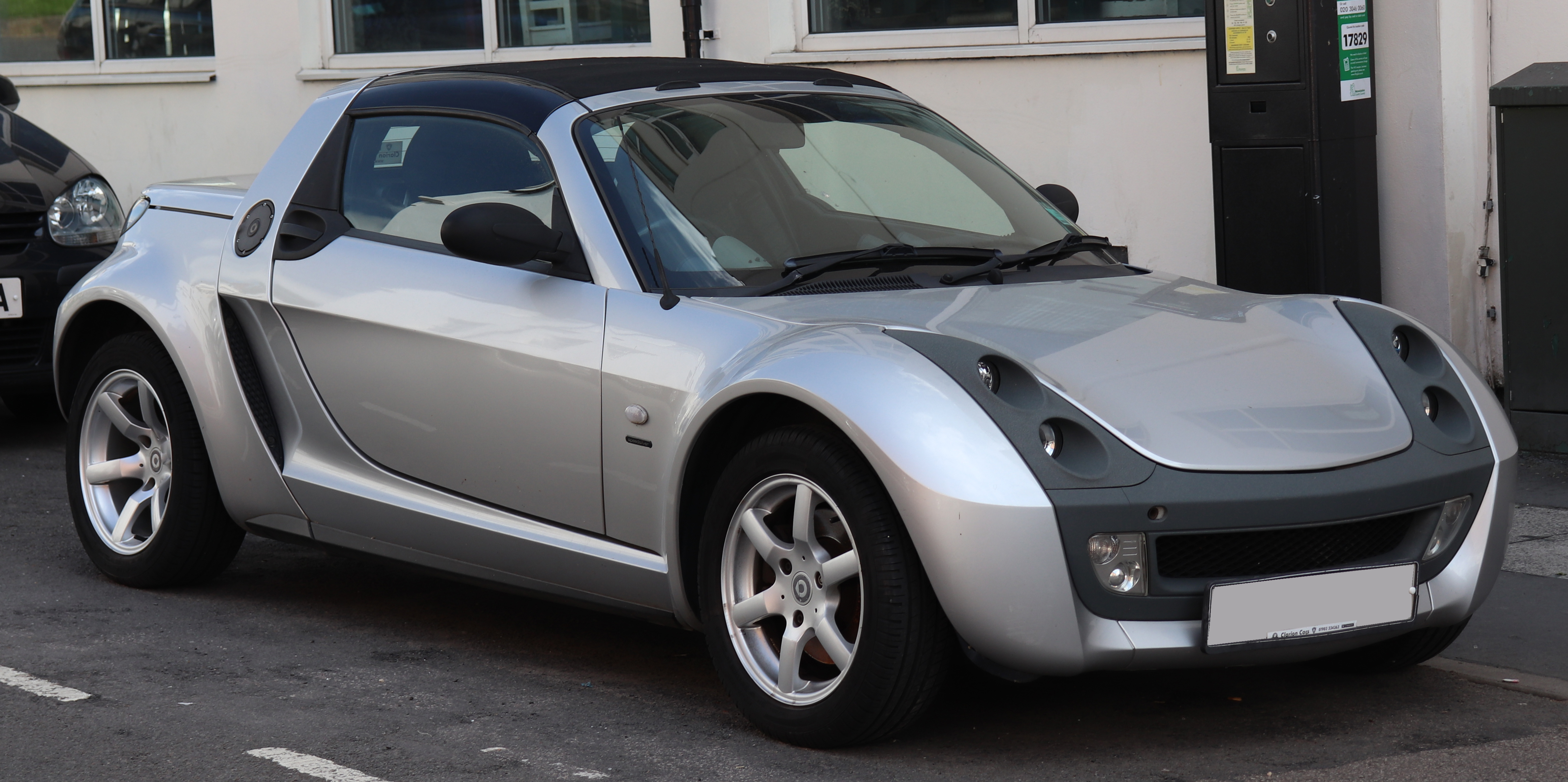

Overview
- Manufacturer: Smart GmbH
- Production: August 2002 – November 2005; 43,091 made
- Assembly: France: Hambach (Smartville)
- Designer: Volker Leutz

Body and chassis
- Class: Sports car (S)
- Body style: 2-door roadster (Roadster); 2-door fastback coupe (Roadster Coupe)
- Layout: Rear mid-engine, rear-wheel-drive
- Related: Smart Fortwo

Powertrain
- Engine: 698 cc M160 turbo I3 (petrol)
- Transmission: 6-speed automated manual

Dimensions
- Wheelbase: 2,360 mm (92.9 in)
- Length: 3,427 mm (134.9 in)
- Width: 1,615 mm (63.6 in)
- Height: 1,192 mm (46.9 in)
- Curb weight: 790 kg (1,742 lb) (roadster); 815 kg (1,797 lb) (coupe)

The Smart Roadster (W452) is a two-door, two-seater sports car classified in the S-segment in Europe. It was first introduced in 2002 by Smart GmbH. The Roadster and its variant, the Roadster Coupé, enjoyed mostly successful sales during their production run. In total, approximately 43,091 units were produced before the model was discontinued in November 2005. The final Smart Roadster built now resides in the Mercedes-Benz Museum. It is defined by a consortium between Switzerland (Swatch), Germany (Mercedes-Benz) and France, whose vehicle remains "Made in France" because it is built entirely at its Hambach factory in Moselle.

== History ==
The two-seat, 2.5 m (98 in) long Smart City-Coupe (later named Smart Fortwo) was launched at the 1998 Paris Motor Show. This was the beginning of a new car brand and one of the more radical vehicle concepts to hit the European market since the bubble cars of the 1950s. It was also the beginning of a difficult period for Smart cars. The City Coupe had stability problems that were only discovered before the launch. This forced a package of alterations to be made that were both expensive and compromised the car's handling, ride, and gear shift. Public concerns over the car's stability, combined with Smart's elitist marketing and the sheer radicality of the car's design, proved damaging to initial sales. Production projections were slashed from 200,000 per year to 80,000 which was almost disastrous for a new brand with just one product.

Within the company, the evangelical buzz surrounding the launch of the radical City-Coupe quickly evaporated. With new management, new marketing initiatives, and continuing revisions to the car's engineering to answer public concerns, future vehicle plans, including the development of a four-seat model, had not been far advanced.

=== Design and development ===
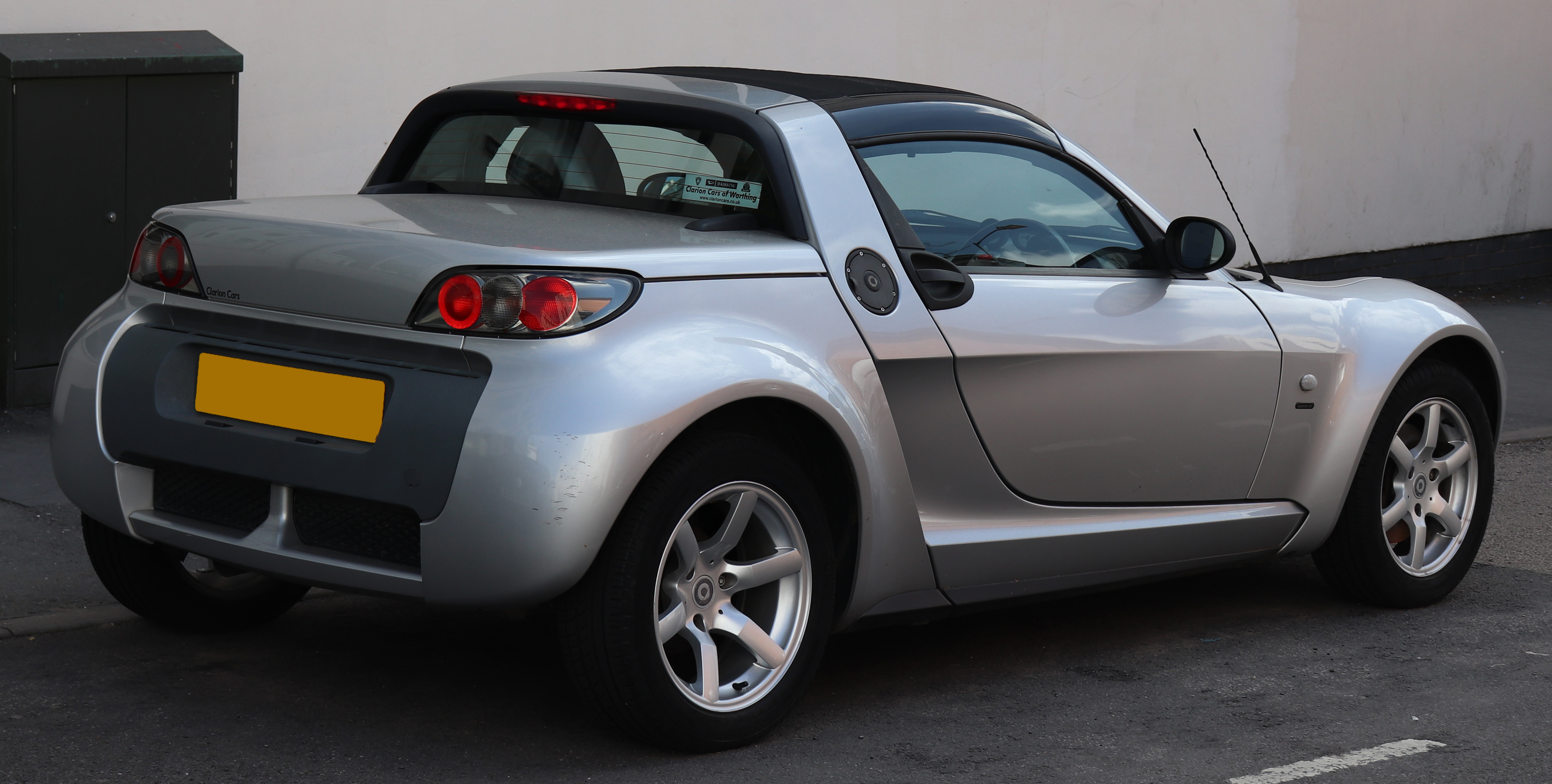
Roadster rear

Under design director Jens Manske in autumn 1998, Smart's 14-person design and engineering team began to sketch possible future Smart cars. They soon realised that the powertrain of the City-Coupe was ideal for a small sports car, with a compact turbo engine driving the rear wheels via a 6-speed automated manual gearbox.

Following Smart's ‘reduce to the max’ philosophy and general innovative approach, a concept for a super compact, practical, and pure sports car was generated. Two quarter-scale exterior and two quarter-scale interior models were made in February 1999 with Volker Leutz's exterior and Christoph Machinek's interior proposals selected for development into full-size development models. The design of the car had progressed considerably by the time Michael Mauer officially arrived from Mercedes-Benz's Japan design centre to take over Menske's position in May 1999. Mauer worked closely with the design team to quickly develop the roadster, with the intention now of producing a show car for the upcoming 1999 IAA Motor Show in Frankfurt.

By June, the full-size models of the roadster were handed over to Stola in Italy for production of the show car model, which was produced in about three months for the car's debut at the Frankfurt show. The Roadster concept was well received at Frankfurt and helped to convince management that the car should be developed for production. At the same time, a decision was made to develop Mauer's idea for a coupe version as a concept car for the Paris motor show a year later. As the development of the coupe concept began, so the roadster show car was developed over the following year with both exterior and interior designs completed by November 2000. However, colour and trim design continued until a year later.

By early 2000, the Smart City-Coupe had finally started to gain sales momentum, with its Cabrio version making a significant addition to total Smart sales. In March, Mauer left Smart for Saab, succeeded by Hartmut Sinkwitz in May. As the third design director of Smart during the Roadster's development, Sinkwitz had to bring the concept to production in a very short time. This task may have been made somewhat easier by the Roadster having been designed from the start to use existing powertrain and other City-Coupe components. Given some of the advanced design features, it is a credit to the design team that so much of the concept car made it to production.

=== Concept car ===
The ‘Roadster Coupe’ as shown at the 2000 Paris Motor Show was already on its way to production form. It shared the design of the Roadster from the doors forward but had a glass Targa roof and rear structure resembling a small shooting-brake in the same way as the BMW Z3 coupe and the Saab 9X concept car developed under Mauer at Saab a few years later.

== Production ==
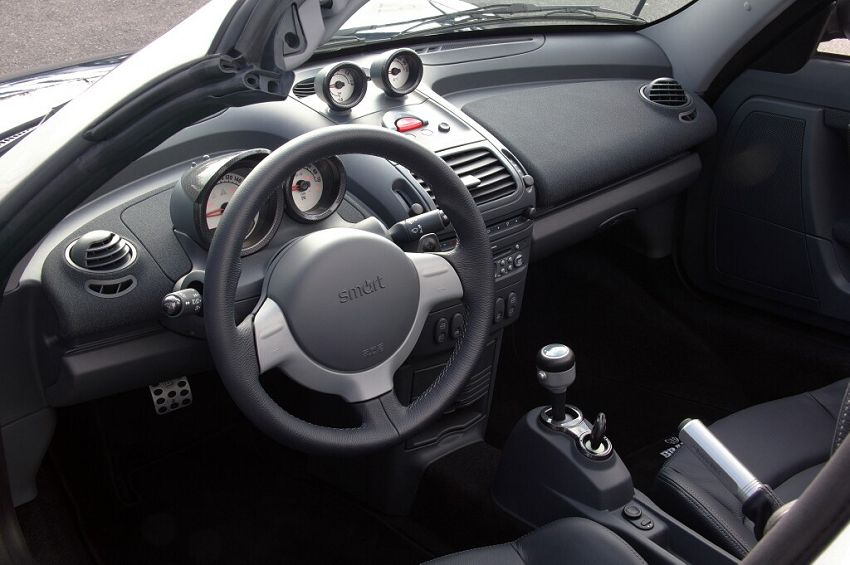
Interior Smart Roadster.

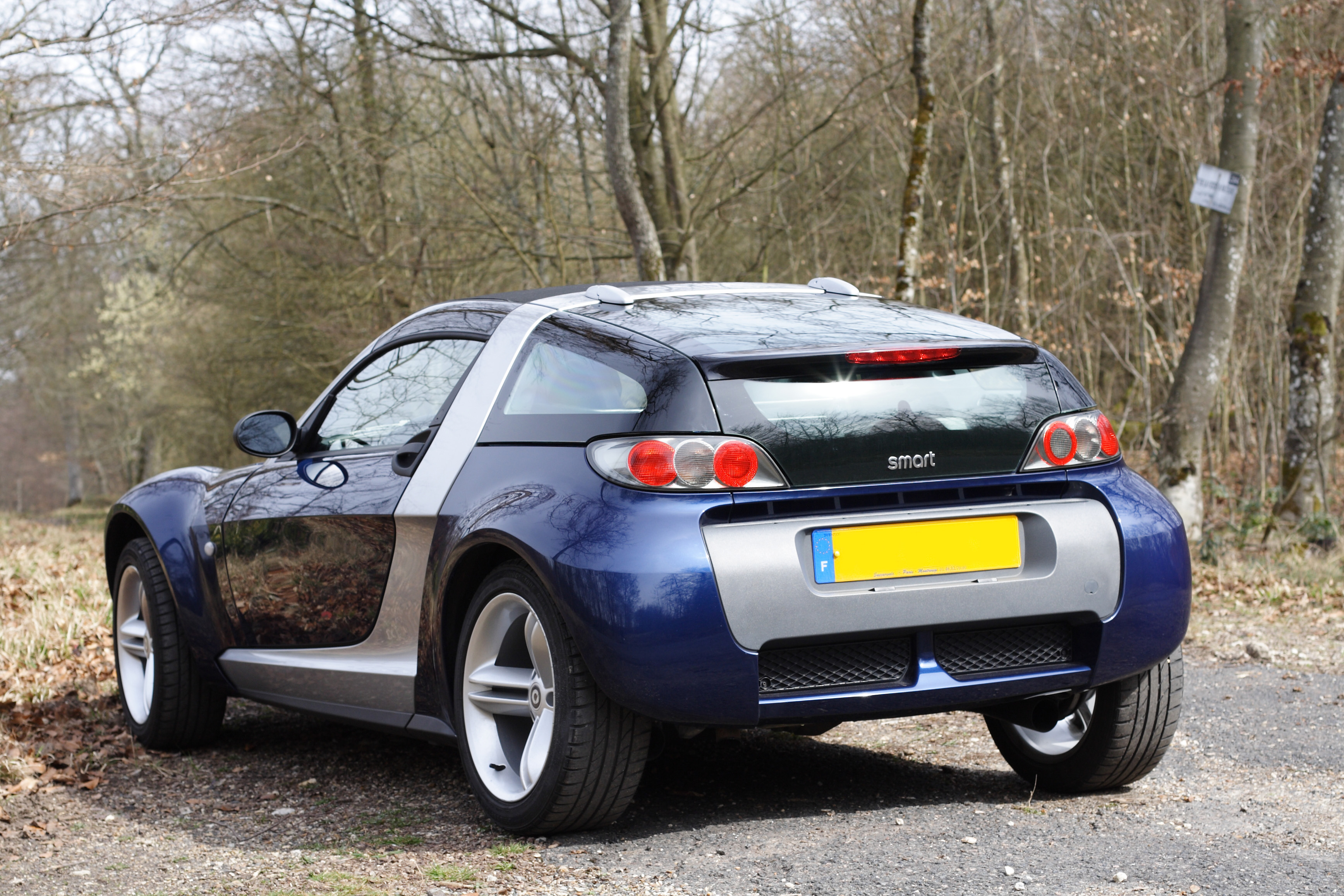
A Smart Roadster Coupe convertible.

The Smart Roadster and Roadster Coupe were introduced in 2002, based on a stretched platform of the Fortwo with a full-length of 3427 mm. The two variants are meant to be reminiscent of the British roadster of yore, such as the Triumph Spitfire or the MG B. Both the Roadster and Roadster Coupe are available with a removable Targa roof or an electrical soft-top. The Roadster is powered by 45 or 60 kW (61 or 82 PS) versions of the turbocharged 698cc 3-cylinder Suprex engine in the rear, which is engineered by Mercedes-Benz. The Roadster Coupe has only the more powerful 60 kW (82 PS; 80 hp) engine. A steering wheel with Formula 1-style paddle-shifters, to control the single-clutch automated manual transmission, is optional. Weighing as little as 790 kg (1,742 lb), the Roadster is intended to provide the emotion of driving a sports car at an affordable cost.

Both the Roadster and Roadster Coupe are available in Brabus-tuned versions with power increased to 74 kW (101 PS; 99 hp). The Brabus versions have a different twin sports exhaust, lower suspension, polished six-spoke aluminum alloy Monoblock VI 17" wheels (205/40 ZR17 at the front and 225/35 ZR17 at the rear), front spoiler, side skirts and radiator grille. Exclusive Brabus (Xclusive) interior includes a leather-trimmed dashboard, alloy-effect accent parts, instrument graphics, leather/aluminium gearshift with Brabus labelled starter button, aluminium handbrake handle (which fouls the central armrest), aluminium pedals and Brabus labeled floor mats. The Monoblock wheels are known to be very soft and as a result, are very easy to buckle. The lacquer on these wheels is also very poor, and corrosion can occur very early in the life of the wheel.

Despite a projected break-even of only 8,000 to 10,000 units per year, first-year sales almost doubled this estimate. British motoring television show and magazine Top Gear praised the Roadster, awarding it Fun Car Of The Year for 2005.

43,091 Roadsters were built and put on the shop fronts, with chassis numbers ranging from 00,001 to around 43,400.

== Brabus V6 Bi-Turbo prototypes ==
In 2003, German tuning house Brabus created a prototype version of the Roadster Coupe with two merged 3-cylinder engines to celebrate the 100th anniversary of the Solituderennen. This V6 bi-turbo powerplant had a maximum power of 160 kW (218 PS; 215 hp) for a weight of only 840 kg (1,852 lb), giving it the same power-to-weight ratio as a Porsche 911 Carrera 4S. Smart claimed the car could accelerate to 100 km/h (62 mph) in under five seconds.

Since the twin-turbo V6 engine occupies almost twice as much space as their 3-cylinder engines, the fuel tank had to be relocated to the nose of the car, where a luggage compartment used to be. It comes in the form of a Formula 1-type foam-rubber fuel bladder. The bigger engine also forced a change from separate coil springs and dampers to concentric units to support the de Dion rear suspension.

Ten cars were built and presented at the Castle Solitude. They are not available for sale and are not even allowed to be driven on public roads in Germany. Some of Mercedes' race drivers, like Markus Winkelhock, drove guests around the event's race track.

== Special editions ==
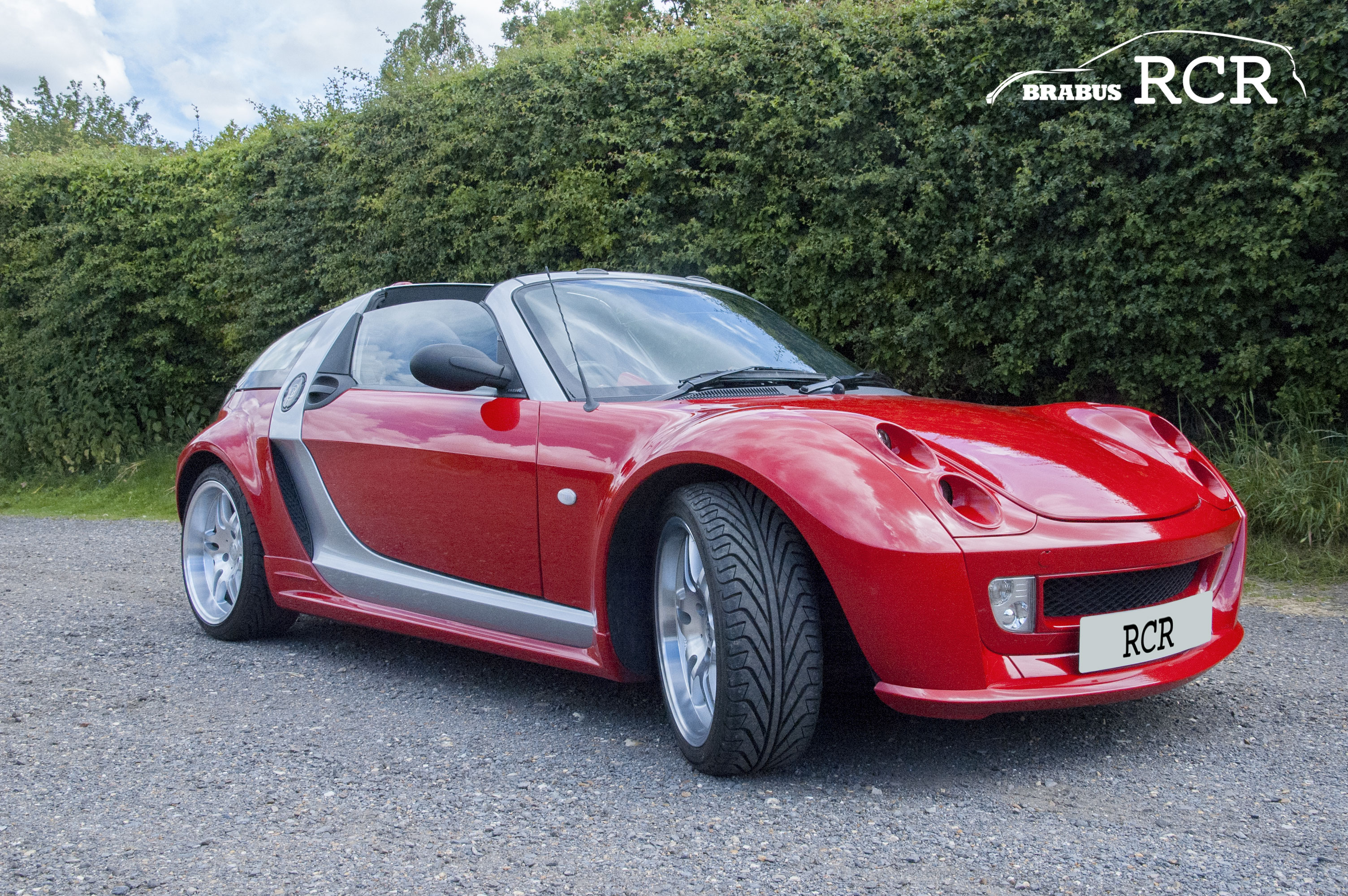
Roadster Brabus RCR.

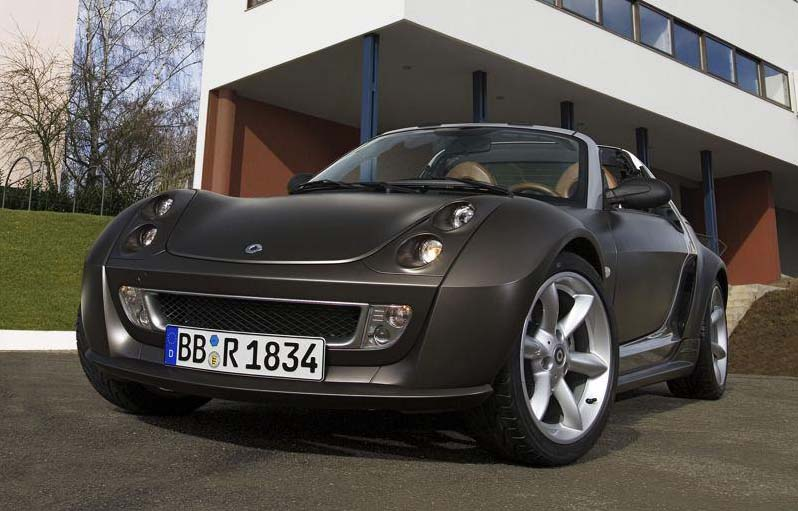
Smart Roadster Collector's Edition.

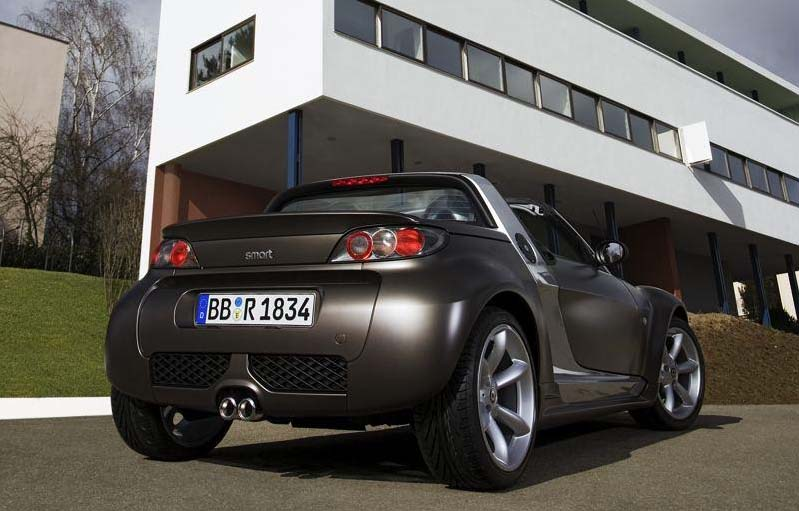
Smart Roadster Collector's Edition.

In March 2006, Smart unveiled the final variant of the Roadster at the Geneva Motor Show: a limited collector's edition.

It was based on the top model Brabus Xclusive with 101 PS (74 kW; 100 hp) and came with a satin brown-metallic paint job. The interior had brown leather and higher quality materials were used extensively. It had the new Run line aluminium wheels and Brabus exhaust, front spoiler, and side fenders. Of 50 planned cars, only 30 were made.

A limited-edition Roadster Coupe Racing edition (RCR) was released in 2005 in the UK. These cars were sent to Brabus in Bottrop to have the Brabus modifications. Only 50 in the world were made and featured all the Brabus trimmings plus special black Alcantara and leather seats with red diamond pattern stitching. The seats were not heated as they are in the main Brabus model. The black Alcantara and red stitching are also featured on the dash and door panels. Interior door handles and clock surrounds were finished in red to match the exterior paintwork. Each comes with a numbered plaque on the glovebox - stating the build number - RCR UK #/50. These cars were finished in Ferrari Red with matching light surrounds and bumper sections, the Tridion safety cell being all silver. All work was done at Brabus including the respray, news springs and shocks, body kit, wheels and unique interior. They all came with a Brabus Certificate of quality. They were made to look like the V6 bi-turbo and came with a free optional SB2 power upgrade kit for the engine, which raised the standard 80 bhp (60 kW) to 92 bhp (69 kW). The reason they were not fitted with the 101 PS (74 kW; 100 hp) engine is that the cars came off the production line in 2004 as normal 80 PS (59 kW; 79 hp) engine roadsters before being given the Brabus makeover. The SB2 upgrade was optional to allow customers the option for lower insurance and road tax/CO_{2} emissions. So some RCRs did not have the SB2 upgrade carried out when new. There were 50 right-hand drive cars (RCR 90) built especially for the UK with the SB2 kit and 92 hp (69 kW). Additionally, Brabus built 7 left-handed cars (RCR 90) for the rest of Europe and only 12 cars of the RCR 101 were altogether built left-handed by Brabus with the real Brabus 101 HP engine. One prototype and 11 numbered cars.

Before the Brabus model released, Smart released the Bluewave in the UK. Effectively, it has all the parts of the later-released Brabus model but without the Brabus engine and without the Brabus suspension. Smart later upset those who purchased the Bluewave by releasing the Brabus for the same price with those extra items. Some Bluewave owners were given the choice of having their car purchased back or a free SB2 upgrade.

An additional, UK and Sweden-only 'Finale Edition' was unveiled in April 2006. This model came in a variety of colour combinations, including an exclusive speed silver and black Tridion with 17-inch Runline alloys and 'flow silver' interior components. It also featured a leather door and cockpit trim and central armrest.

== Project Kimber ==
In 2006, David James initiated Project Kimber, an attempt to restart production of the Smart Roadster in the United Kingdom. Initially, intended to be rebadged as an MG model, after an unsuccessful bid for the MG marque, the revised Roadster was later referred to as the AC Ace.

== Gallery ==
Smart Roadster

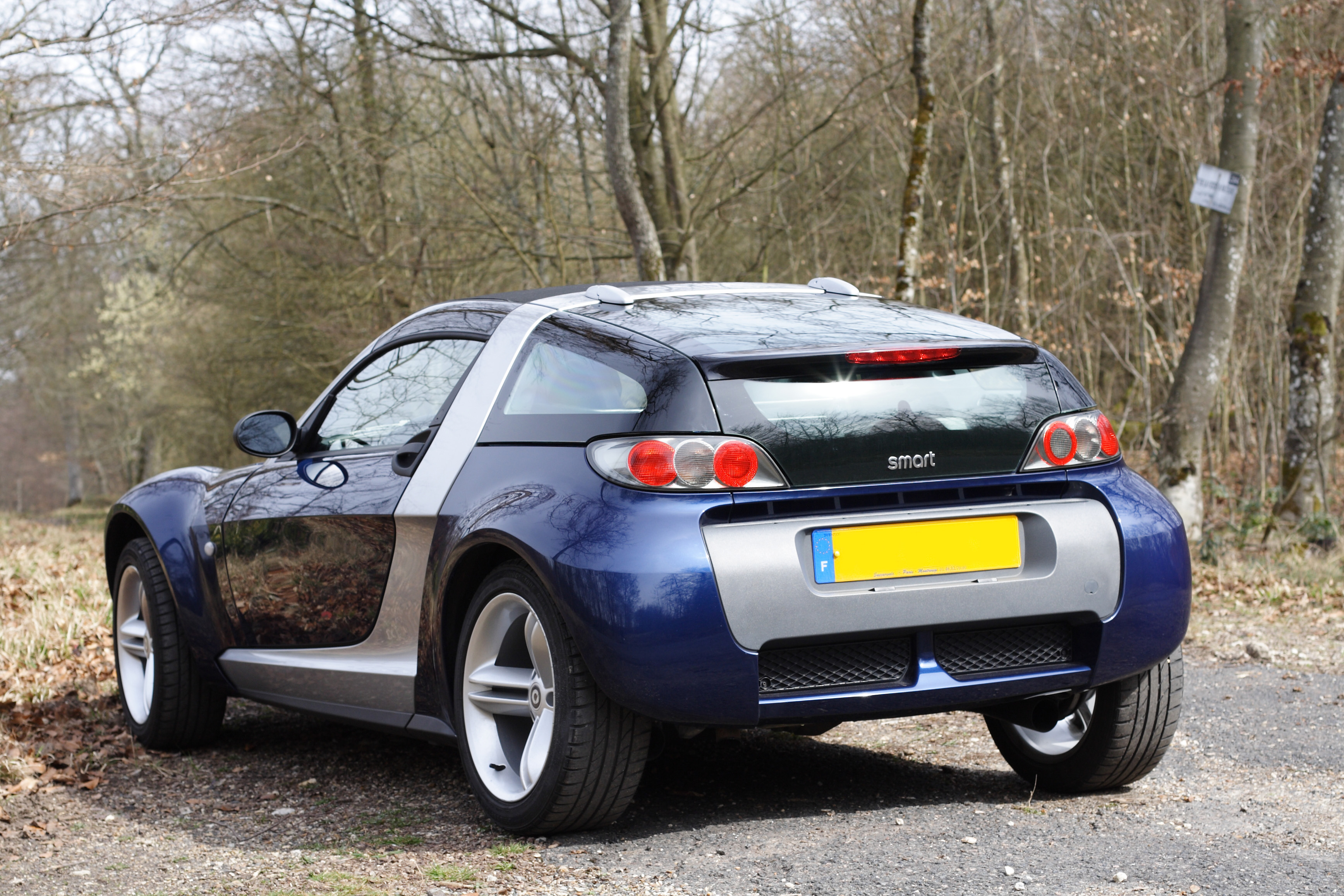
A Smart Roadster Coupe convertible.

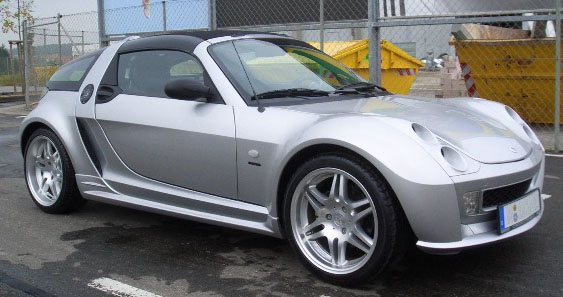
Smart Roadster Coupe Brabus.

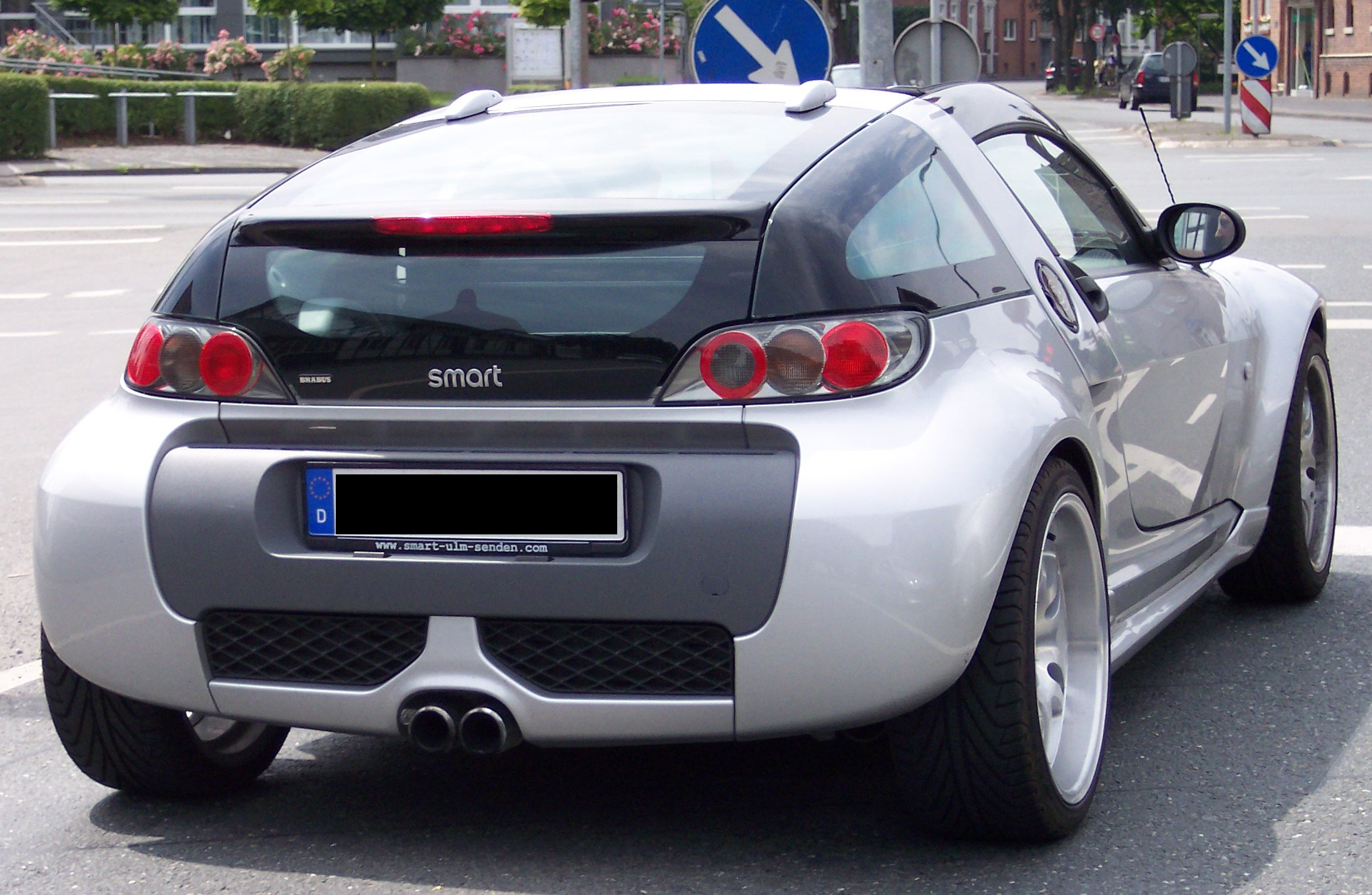
Brabus Coupe, rear

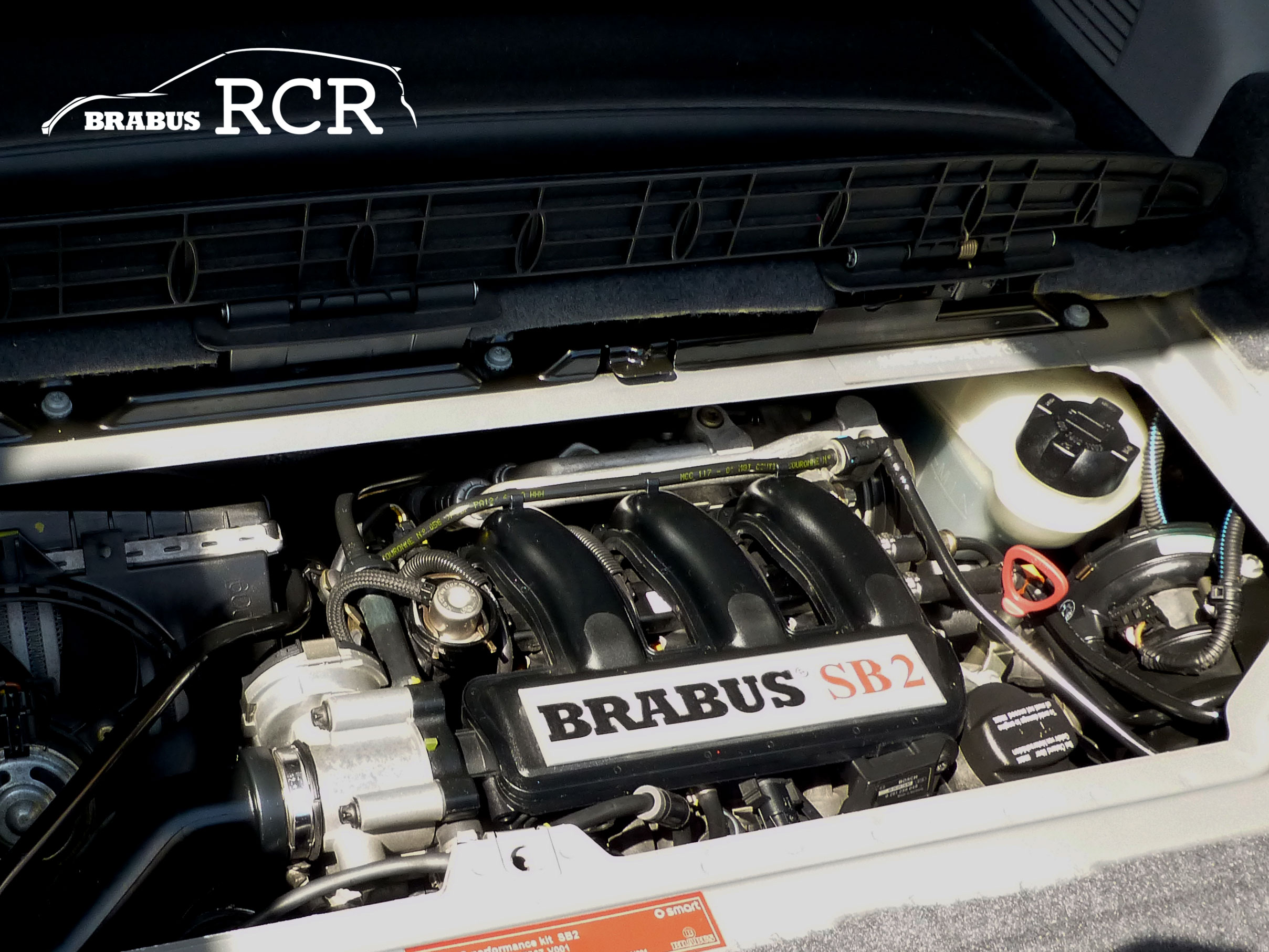
RCR SB2 Engine

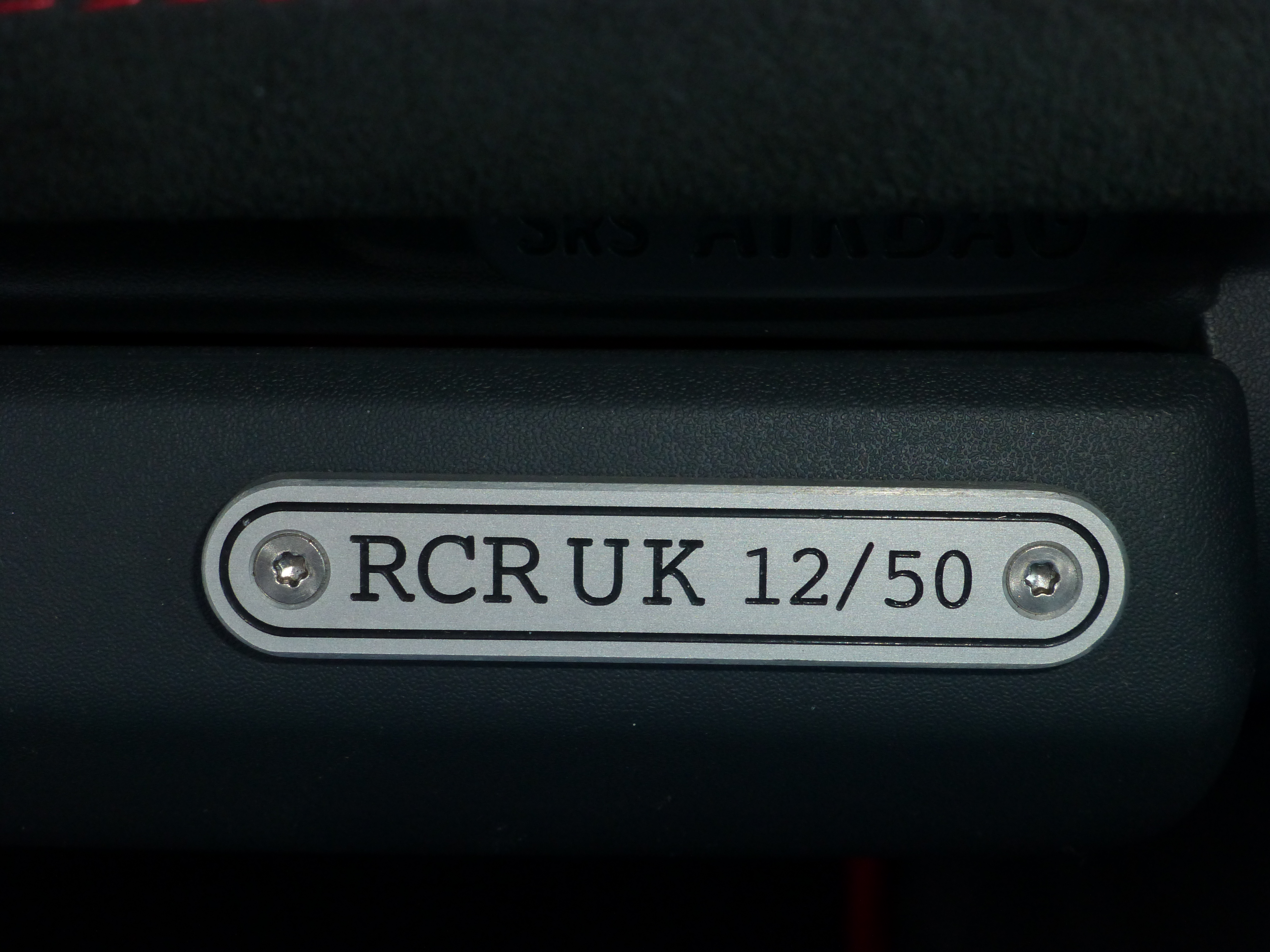
RCR SB2 Dash Plate
