= Ineos Automotive =

Automobile manufacturer

- Type: Subsidiary
- Industry: Automotive
- Founded: 2016; 10 years ago
- Founder: Jim Ratcliffe
- Headquarters: London, England
- Key people: Jim Ratcliffe (Chair); Lynn Calder (CEO)
- Products: Grenadier · Grenadier Quartermaster
- Parent: Ineos
- Website: ineosgrenadier.com

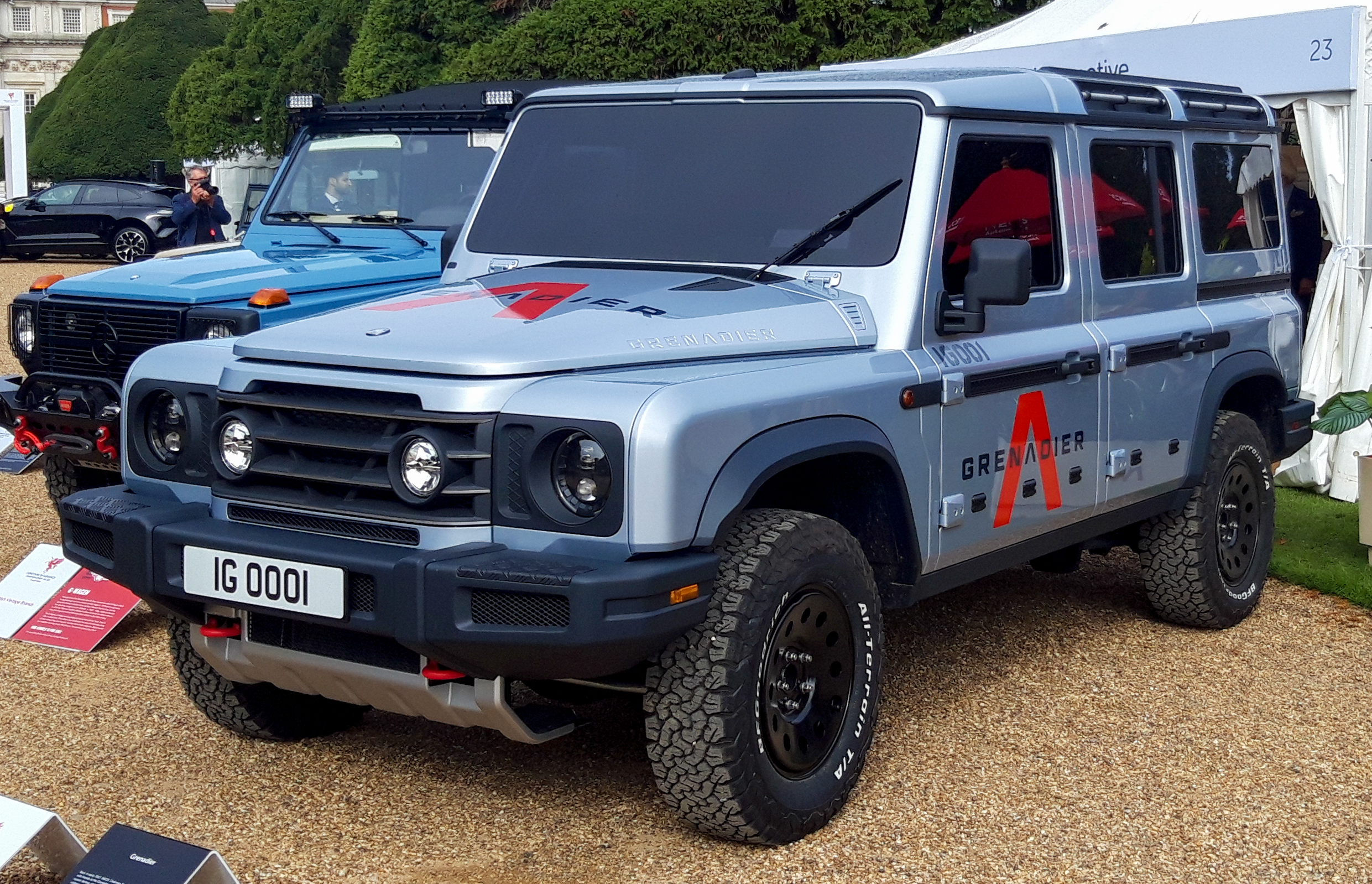
Preproduction version of the Ineos Grenadier (2020)

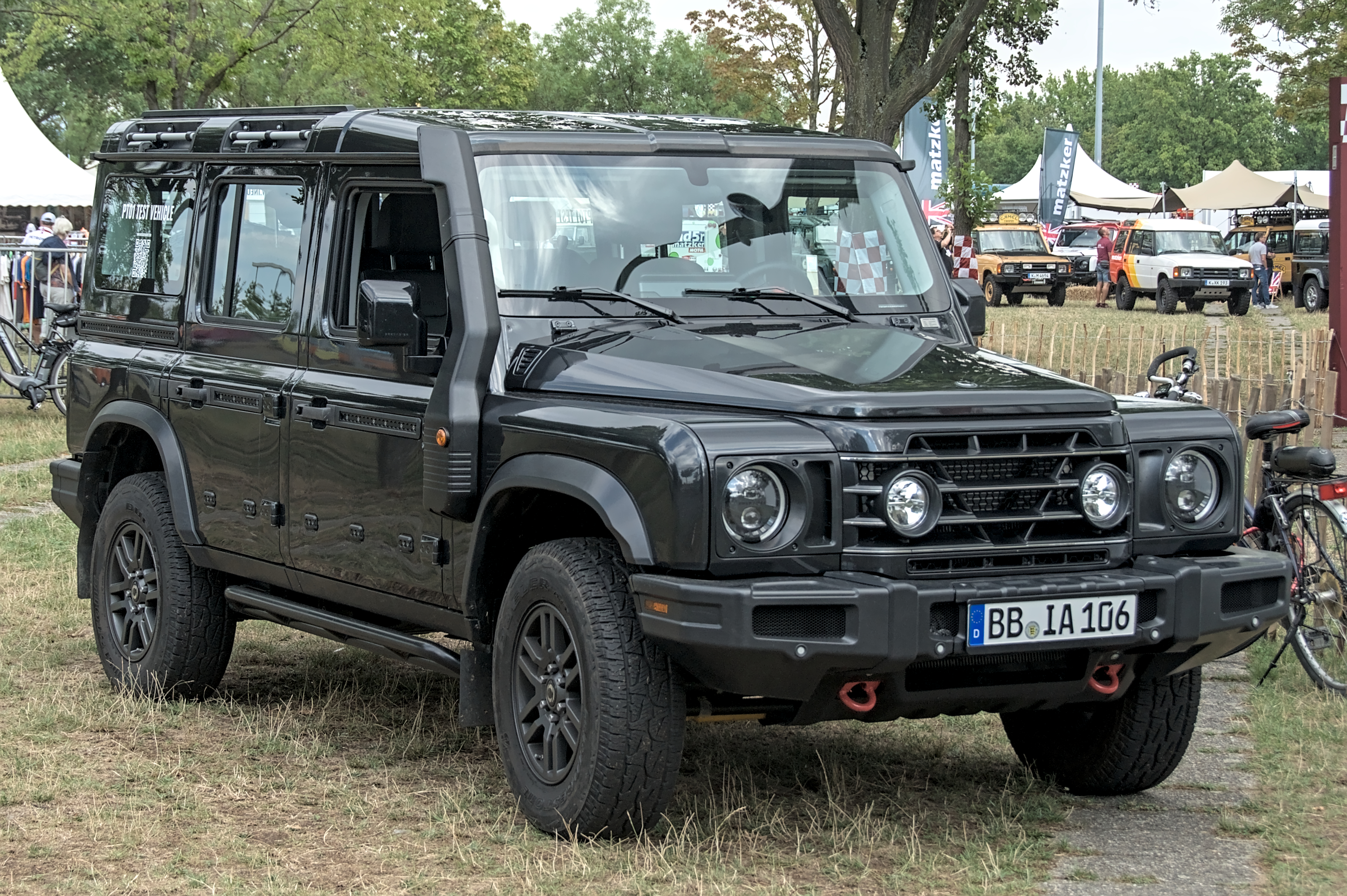
Ineos Grenadier (2022)

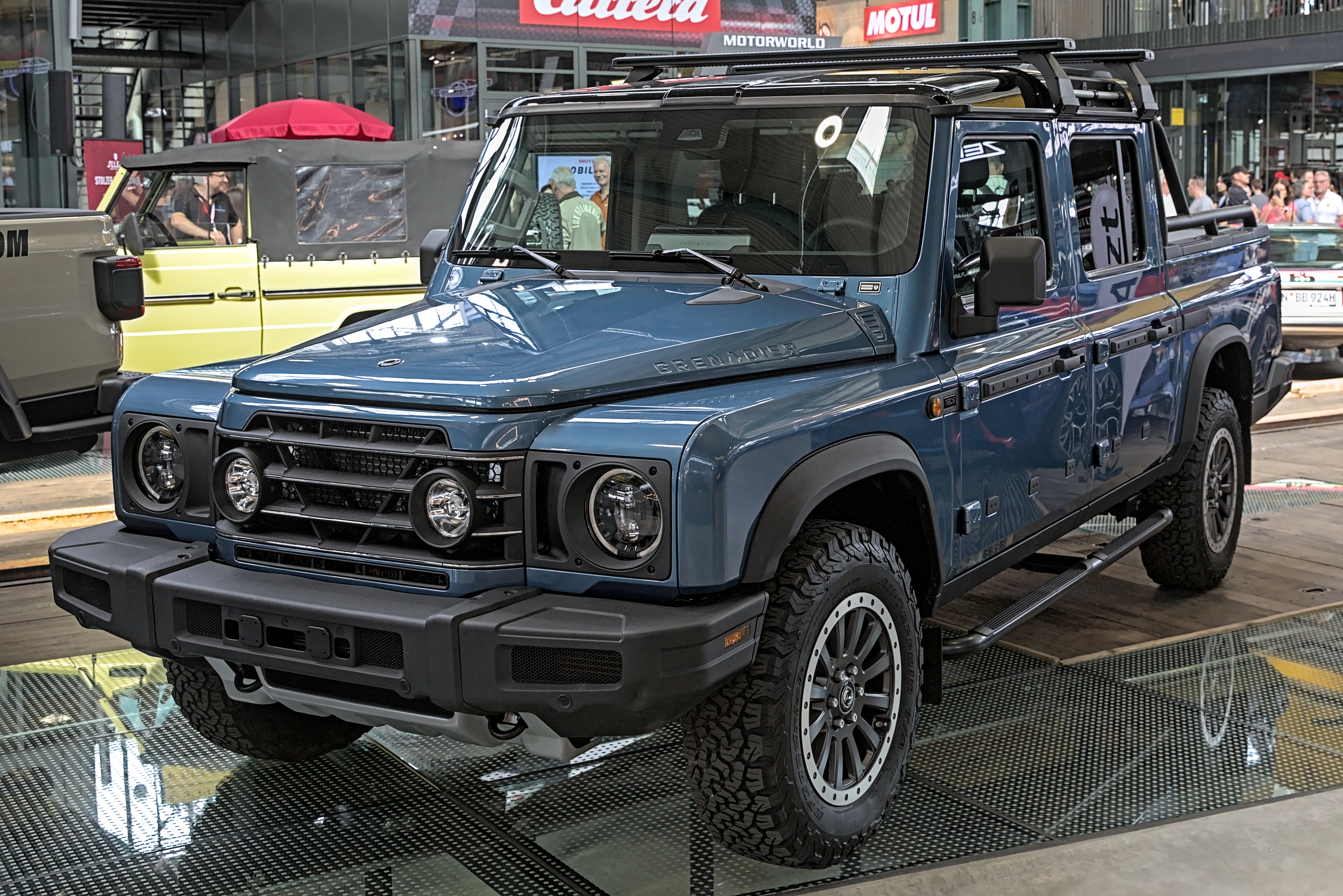
Ineos Grenadier Quartermaster (2024)

Ineos Automotive Ltd is a British manufacturer of off-road vehicles based in London, operating since 2016. It belongs to the multinational conglomerate Ineos.

== History ==
Ineos Automotive Ltd was founded by Sir Jim Ratcliffe, chairman of the multinational chemicals company Ineos. Ratcliffe came up with the idea of building a replacement for his Land Rover Defender and approached Jaguar Land Rover to buy the tooling to continue production after the original model ceased at Solihull after 67 years in January 2016, but the firm declined. Ratcliffe later decided to initiate a project to design and build a similar vehicle under the codename Projekt Grenadier. The vehicle is named after Ratcliffe's favourite pub, The Grenadier, in Belgravia, London, where the initial idea was considered, and where a promotional presentation was shown.

The first information about the Ineos Grenadier model was revealed in July 2020, and the interior design of the passenger cabin and technical specifications were presented a year later, in mid-2021. The technological partners of the project include Magna Steyr, as well as BMW providing engine supplies. Originally, production of the Grenadier was to start at the end of 2021 at the specially built Welsh plant in Bridgend. After receiving an offer from Daimler to buy the Smart factory in Hambach, France, Ineos finally agreed to locate the production of its off-road vehicle in this place. Ultimately, production of the Grenadier began in October 2022.

After starting mass production and sales of the Grenadier, Ineos Automotive is focusing on the development of alternative drive sources for the off-road car in order to expand the range of versions in the future. In October 2021, the British company confirmed that it had entered into a partnership with the Hyundai Motor Group to build a hydrogen fuel cell-powered Grenadier. In 2022, the company also revealed that it was considering developing a fully electric version of the Grenadier, which was further developed two years later, when in February 2024 a prototype of the second Ineos model was presented, a fully electric or hybrid, clearly smaller Fusilier. The start of production of the serial model was scheduled for no earlier than 2027, but was cancelled in early July 2024.

== Senior leadership ==
- Chairman: Sir Jim Ratcliffe (since February 2017)
- Chief Executive: Lynn Calder (since December 2022)

=== List of previous chief executives ===
1. Dirk Heilmann (2017–2022)

== Models ==
=== Current ===
- Grenadier
- Grenadier Quartermaster

=== Upcoming ===
- Ineos Fusilier
