= Smartville =

Smartville can refer to:

- Smartville, Hambach, France
- Smartsville, California, formerly named Smartville.
- Smartville Block, a geologic zone in the Sierra foothills of California
