= B&F Fk9 =

1989 ultralight aircraft by B&F in Germany

Fk9
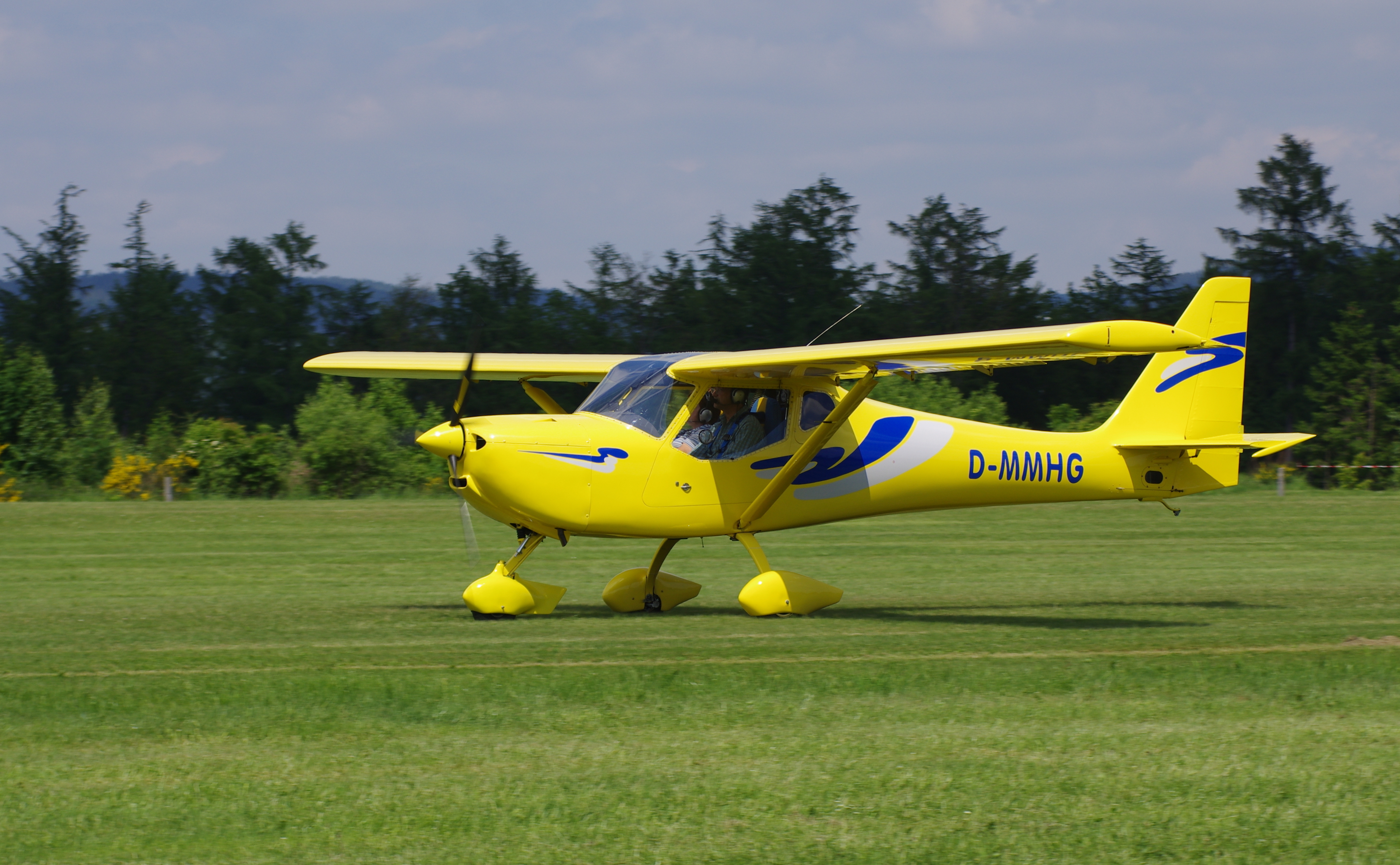
- B&F FK9

General information
- Type: Two seat ultralight
- National origin: Germany
- Manufacturer: B&F Technik Vertriebs GmbH, Speyer
- Designer: Otto and Peter Funk
- Status: In production
- Number built: 370+ by end 2008

History
- First flight: early 1989

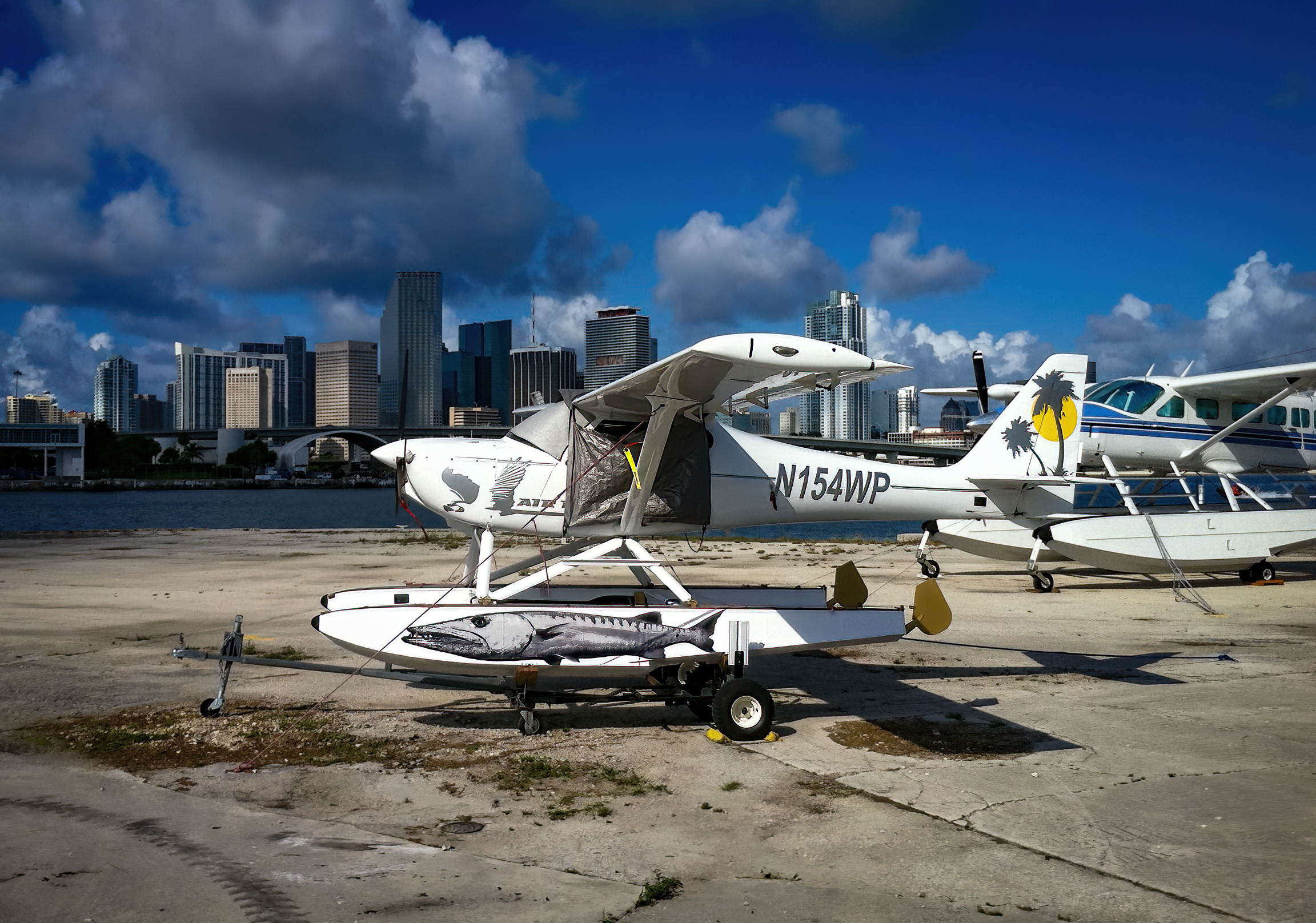
B&F FK-9 Mk IV floatplane, Miami, june 2011

The B&F Fk9, also marketed as the FK-Lightplanes FK9, is a German-designed single-engine, two-seat ultralight, first flown in 1989. It has been developed from a mixed structure, fabric covered aircraft to a wholly composite machine. It remains in production at factories in Germany and Poland and has sold in large numbers, flying on four continents.

== Design and development ==
Otto Funk had designed and built gliders and motor glider since 1970 but the Fk9 was both his first commercial product and his first aircraft with design input from his son Peter. Peter Funk and Dirk Breitkreuz set up B&F Technik in 1990 to produce it. The early Marks 1 and 2 were wholly constructed in Krosno, Poland; current models are 85% Polish built, with final assembly in Speyer, Germany. The type is quite often referred to as the Funk Fk9, though not by its makers.

The Fk9 is a conventionally laid out high wing, single-engine ultralight, with side-by-side seating and a fixed undercarriage. The wings have parallel chord and are fitted with ailerons and three-position flaps. They are braced with a single faired strut to the lower fuselage on each side. In the Mark 1 and 2 models, the wings were composite structures with fabric covering; later models have had all-carbon composite wings apart from aluminium control surfaces. There is now the option of an all-carbon fibre wing.

The early Fk9 marks also had a steel tube, fabric covered fuselage, but this has been replaced with an all-glass fibre structure, apart from a steel cabin frame. Access to the dual control cabin, which has overhead transparencies, is via top-hinged doors on each side. The fin and rudder are swept, mostly on the leading edge; the elevators are horn balanced. A tricycle undercarriage is standard, with (usually) spatted mainwheels on spring cantilever legs mounted on the fuselage at the base of the wing struts plus a spatted, steerable nosewheel. The mainwheels have brakes operated by a central hand control. A conventional undercarriage is an option, with the mainwheel legs fuselage-mounted further forward, below the cabin doors, plus a carbon-and-steel tailwheel.

A variety of engines have been fitted. Early models used a 26 kW (35 hp) Rotax 447 or Jabiru, or a (37 kW) 50 hp Rotax 503. The Mark 3 had a 60 kW (80 hp) Rotax 912 UL and the Mark IV offers a choice between this engine, the uprated 73 kW (99 hp) Rotax 912 ULS or a 75 kW (100 hp) Ecofly M160, first used in production Fk9s in the Smart variant.

The design is an accepted Federal Aviation Administration special light-sport aircraft.

== Operational history ==
The Fk9 prototype first flew early in 1989, making its first public appearance that April at the Aero trade fair in Friedrichshafen. By late 2008, before the introduction of the ELA variant, at least 370 Fk9s of all types had been sold. The mid-2010 European registers (excluding Russia) note 387 aircraft, including four ELAs. Other Fk9s fly in North and South America, where there are agencies, as in South Africa. US LSA for kits was given in 2005. UK microlight weight limits exclude the Fk9 as an assembled aircraft, but the recent ELA regulations are expected to allow that version to be registered.

Reviewer Marino Boric described the design in a 2015 review as "an all-composite Cessna 150 lookalike, but with much improved performance".

== Variants ==
Information from

- Fk9 Mark 1
  Composite wings, metal tube fuselage. First production version. Introduced 1991.
  Fk9 Mark 2
  Revised to accept more powerful (45–80 hp) engines. Conventional gear. Introduced 1995.

Fk9TG: Mark 2 with tricycle gear.

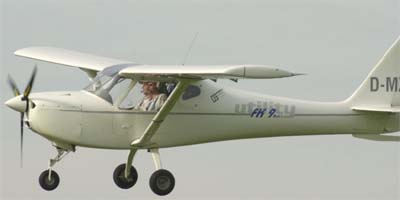
Fk9 Mark 3 Utility fitted for glider towing

- Fk9 Mark 3
  First all-composites version; fuselage shape strongly revised, more slender aft. Introduced 1997.

Mark 38: Marketed in Brazil as Alpha Bravo Fk9. Span 10.33 m.
Mark 3 Utility/Club: For trainer or glider towing roles. New wings. Introduced 2000.

- Fk9 Smart
  powered by Ecofly M160 three-cylinder turbocharged diesel engine from Smart car, producing 100 hp (75 kW) at 5600 rpm. Introduced 2004.

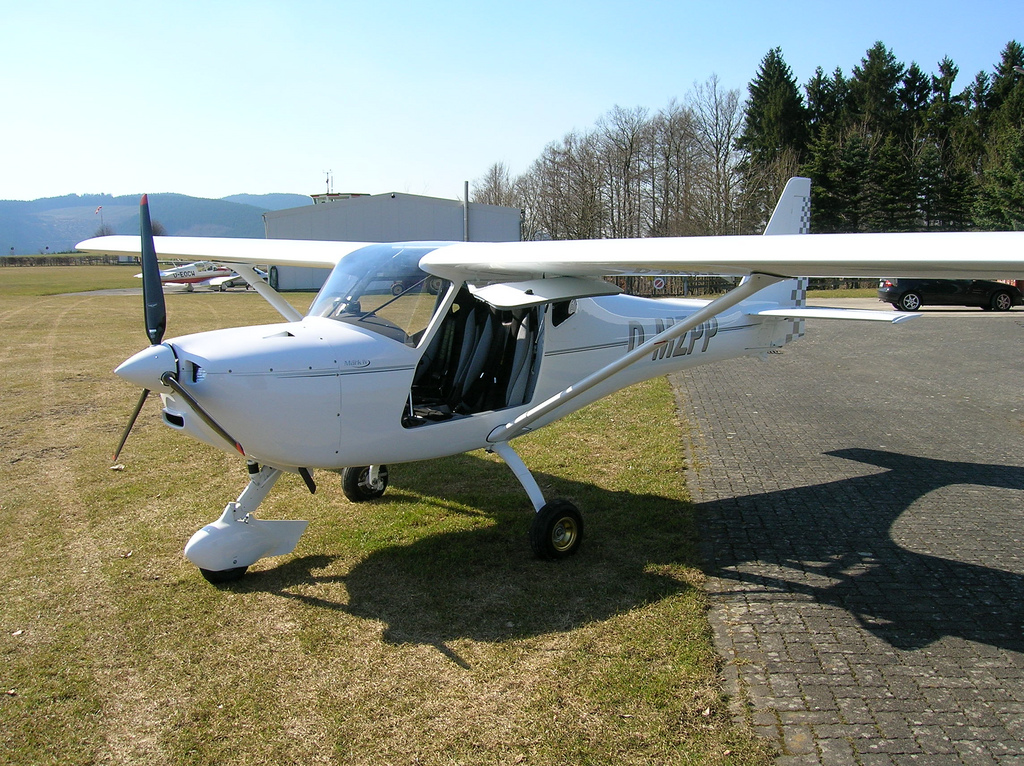
Fk9 Mark IV SW

- Fk9 Mark IV
  Replaced Mark 3 with larger cabin, flaps (30°) and tailplane. Introduced 2003.

Mark IV SW: Short span wing, better downward visibility.
Mark IV Utility: For trainer or glider towing roles. Tricycle or conventional gear options.

- Fk9 ELA
  Mark IV improved to fit European Light Aircraft category. Removal of the cabin tubular of structure impvroving visibility through the windscreen, addition of a laggage compartment. Introduced 2009.
  Fk9 Mark VI
  Fully composite construction, redesigned stern tube. Introduced in 2020.

== Specifications (Mark IV, Rotax 912 UL, tricycle undercarriage) ==
Data from Jane's All the World's Aircraft 2010/11

General characteristics

- Capacity: two
- Length: 5.85 m (19 ft 2 in)
- Wingspan: 9.85 m (32 ft 4 in)
- Height: 2.15 m (7 ft 1 in)
- Wing area: 11.60 m^{2} (124.9 sq ft)
- Empty weight: 278 kg (613 lb)
- Max takeoff weight: 544 kg (1,199 lb) or national ultralight limit
- Powerplant: 1 × Rotax 912UL 4-cylinder horizontally opposed, 60 kW (80 hp)
- Propellers: 3-bladed Junkers or Duc carbon fibre, with ground-adjustable pitch

Performance

- Cruise speed: 196 km/h (122 mph, 106 kn) at 75% power
- Stall speed: 64 km/h (40 mph, 35 kn)
- Never exceed speed: 230 km/h (140 mph, 120 kn)
- Range: 1,000 km (620 mi, 540 nmi)
- g limits: +6.01/-3.0
- Rate of climb: 5.0 m/s (980 ft/min)
