= Ineos Grenadier =

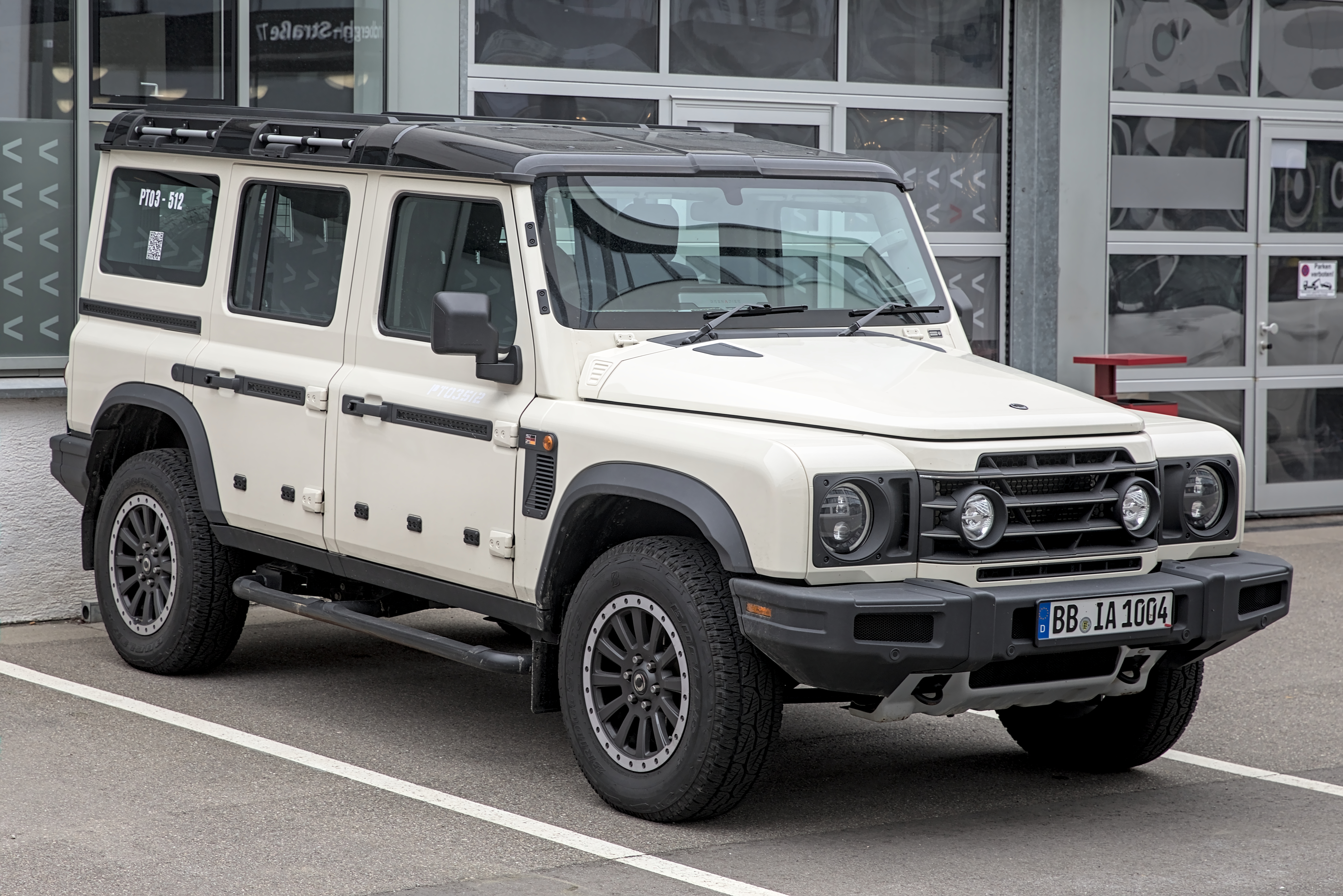

Overview
- Manufacturer: Ineos Automotive
- Production: October 2022 – present
- Model years: 2023–present
- Assembly: France: Hambach (Smartville)
- Designer: Toby Ecuyer (head of design)

Body and chassis
- Class: Full-size SUV; Full-size pickup truck (Quartermaster)
- Body style: 5-door SUV; 4-door pickup truck (Quartermaster)
- Layout: Front-engine, four-wheel drive

Powertrain
- Engine: Petrol: 3.0 L B58B30M0 I6 turbo; Diesel: 3.0 L B57D30O0 I6 turbo
- Transmission: ZF 8HP 8-speed automatic

Dimensions
- Wheelbase: 2,922 mm (115.0 in); 3,227 mm (127.0 in) (Quartermaster)
- Length: 4,856 mm (191.2 in); 5,400 mm (212.6 in) (Quartermaster)
- Width: 1,930 mm (76.0 in); 1,943 mm (76.5 in) (Quartermaster)
- Height: 2,036 mm (80.2 in); 2,019 mm (79.5 in) (Quartermaster)
- Kerb weight: 2,644–2,811 kg (5,829–6,197 lb)

The Ineos Grenadier is an off-road utility vehicle designed and produced by Ineos Automotive. It went into production in October 2022. The Grenadier was designed to be a modern replacement for the original Land Rover Defender, with boxy bodywork, a steel ladder chassis, beam axles with long-travel progressive-rate coil spring suspension (front and rear), and powered by a petrol BMW B58 or diesel BMW B57 inline six turbocharged engine.

== History ==
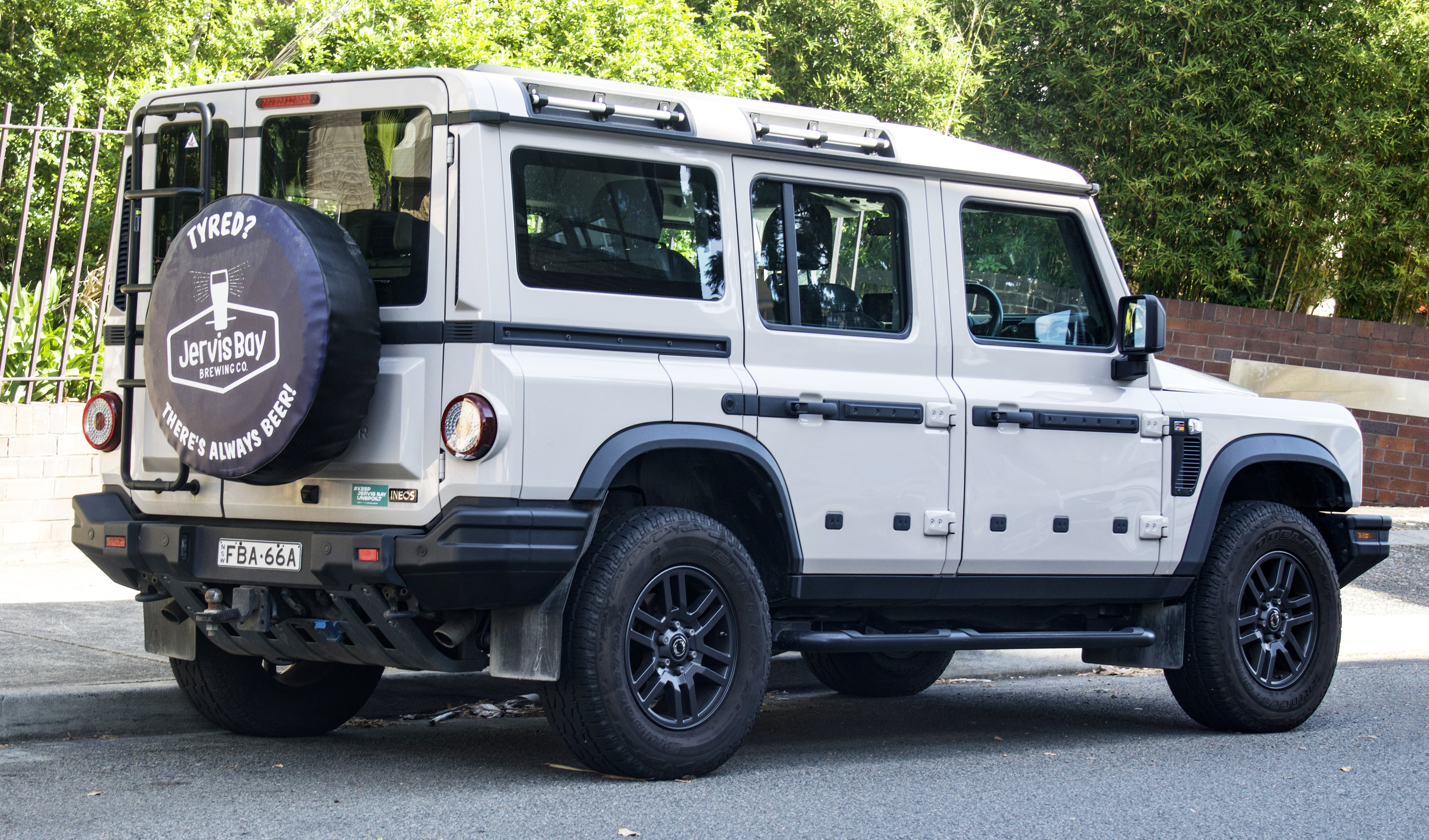
Rear view

Ineos Automotive Ltd was founded by Sir Jim Ratcliffe, chairman of the multinational chemicals company Ineos. Ratcliffe came up with the idea of building a replacement for his Land Rover Defender and approached Jaguar Land Rover to buy the tooling to continue production after the original model ceased at Solihull after 67 years in January 2016, but the firm declined. Ratcliffe later decided to initiate a project to design and build a similar vehicle under the codename Project Grenadier.

The vehicle is named after Ratcliffe's favourite pub, The Grenadier, in Belgravia, London, where the initial idea was considered, and where a promotional presentation was shown. Comparing this project to James Dyson's plan to build an electric car in Singapore, which was cancelled in October 2019, writing off £500 million of his own money, an industry insider commented "If JLR, which made the Defender for 70 years, is struggling, then that's an indicator of how tough it's going to be for a newcomer".

The vehicle was proposed to be manufactured in Wales, but later confirmed to be made in France. Production started in July 2022 at the Ineos Automotive plant in Hambach, France. The first deliveries were made in December 2022.

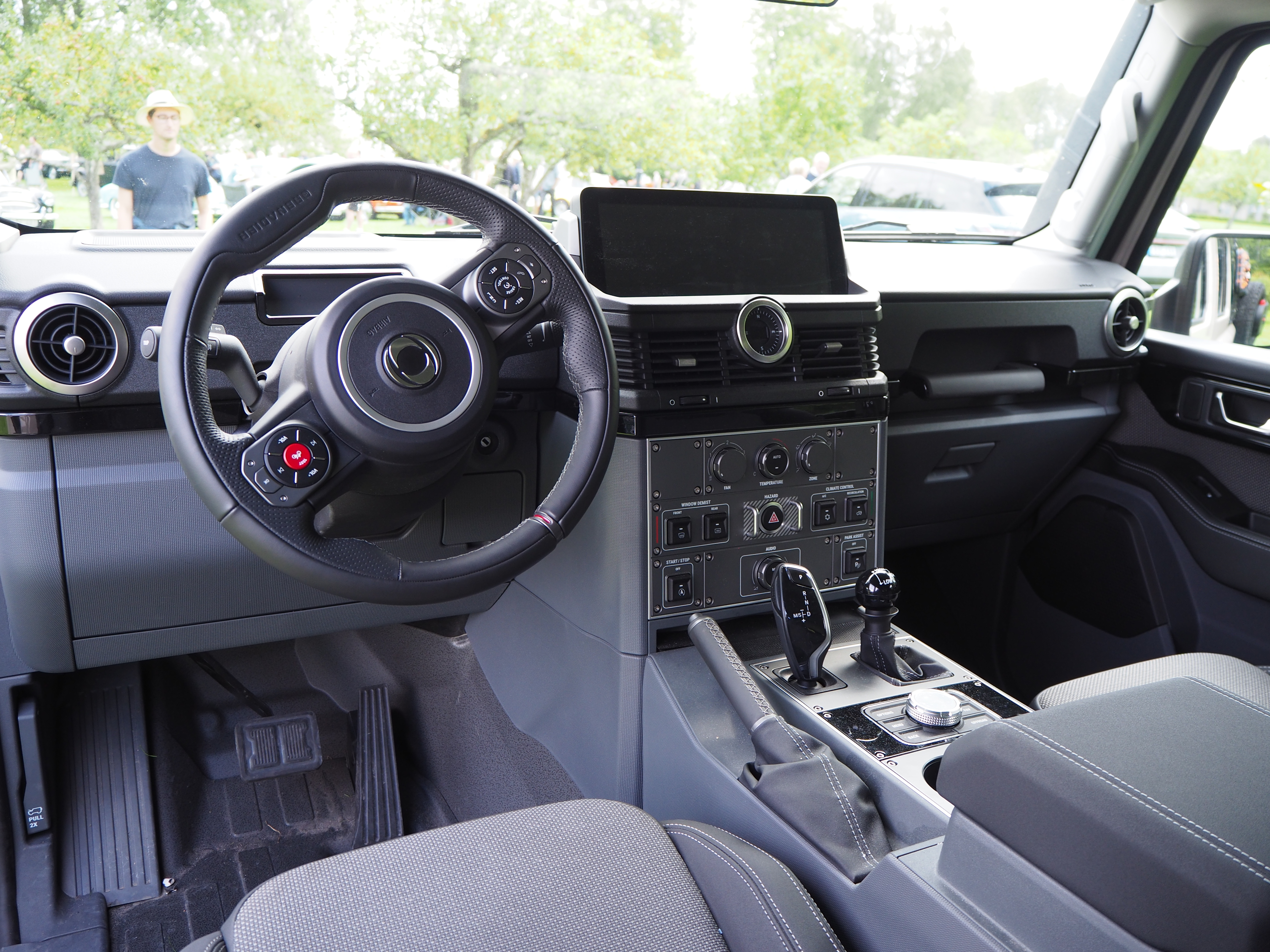
Interior

In March 2019, Ineos Automotive announced that it had entered into a powertrain technology partnership with BMW. It was announced in September 2019 that the Grenadier would be manufactured at a bespoke new manufacturing facility on a greenfield site in Bridgend, Wales. Ineos Automotive also confirmed that it would be investing in a sub-assembly plant in Estarreja, Portugal, for the Grenadier's body and chassis. In December 2019, Ineos Automotive announced the Austrian-based Magna Steyr as its engineering partner for the development of the Grenadier. This partnership would oversee turning the development project concept into a mass-produced vehicle. Development of the off-roader would see it undergo 1.1 million miles (1.8 million km) as part of a gruelling testing regime. Mark Tennant, the commercial director of Ineos Automotive, told the Financial Times there had been 50,000 expressions of interest before the designs of the vehicle had been made public. The firm expects to build 25,000 Grenadier models a year at full capacity. In June 2020, Ineos Automotive unveiled a first look at the exterior design of the Grenadier, as well as some technical information relating to the vehicle's chassis, towing capabilities and suspension.

On 7 July 2020, it was reported that Ineos Automotive was in talks with Daimler AG, the owner of Mercedes-Benz, to buy the Smart factory in Hambach, France, and build the Grenadier there instead of Wales and Portugal. "It's a serious business consideration," Tennant said. Ken Skates, Welsh Government Minister for Economy, Transport and North Wales said it would be "a real blow if Ineos reneged on its very public commitment". The government of Wales was reported in July 2020 to have spent £5 million on supporting the Ineos factory development at Bridgend with enabling work and road infrastructure, and said at that time that it would "look to recoup appropriate costs from the company" if the Bridgend factory was cancelled.

In November 2020, it was announced that Ineos would work with Korean carmaker Hyundai on a longer-term plan to develop a reliable source of hydrogen in Europe to use Hyundai fuel cell technology, with no carbon dioxide emissions, on later Grenadier production.

On 8 December 2020, Ineos announced it had purchased the Smartville factory at Hambach, France, to build the Grenadier, stating that the site's location "gives excellent access to supply chains, automotive talent and target markets". Ineos denied on Twitter having received "grants or other direct financial support" from either the Welsh or Portuguese governments. On 29 September 2021, Ineos announced it would locate its North American headquarters in Raleigh, North Carolina. In November 2021, Ineos Automotive revealed that it had made losses exceeding £250 million over three years on the project. Other companies owned by Ratcliffe made loans to the automotive subsidiary, so that his total commitment at the time could be over £650 million.

In January 2022, Ineos's engineering team was caught in a 'one-in-a-hundred year (flood) event' during hot weather testing in outback South Australia. Ineos plans on returning to Australia to complete this testing, along with undertaking an expedition of the Canning Stock Route.

== Design ==
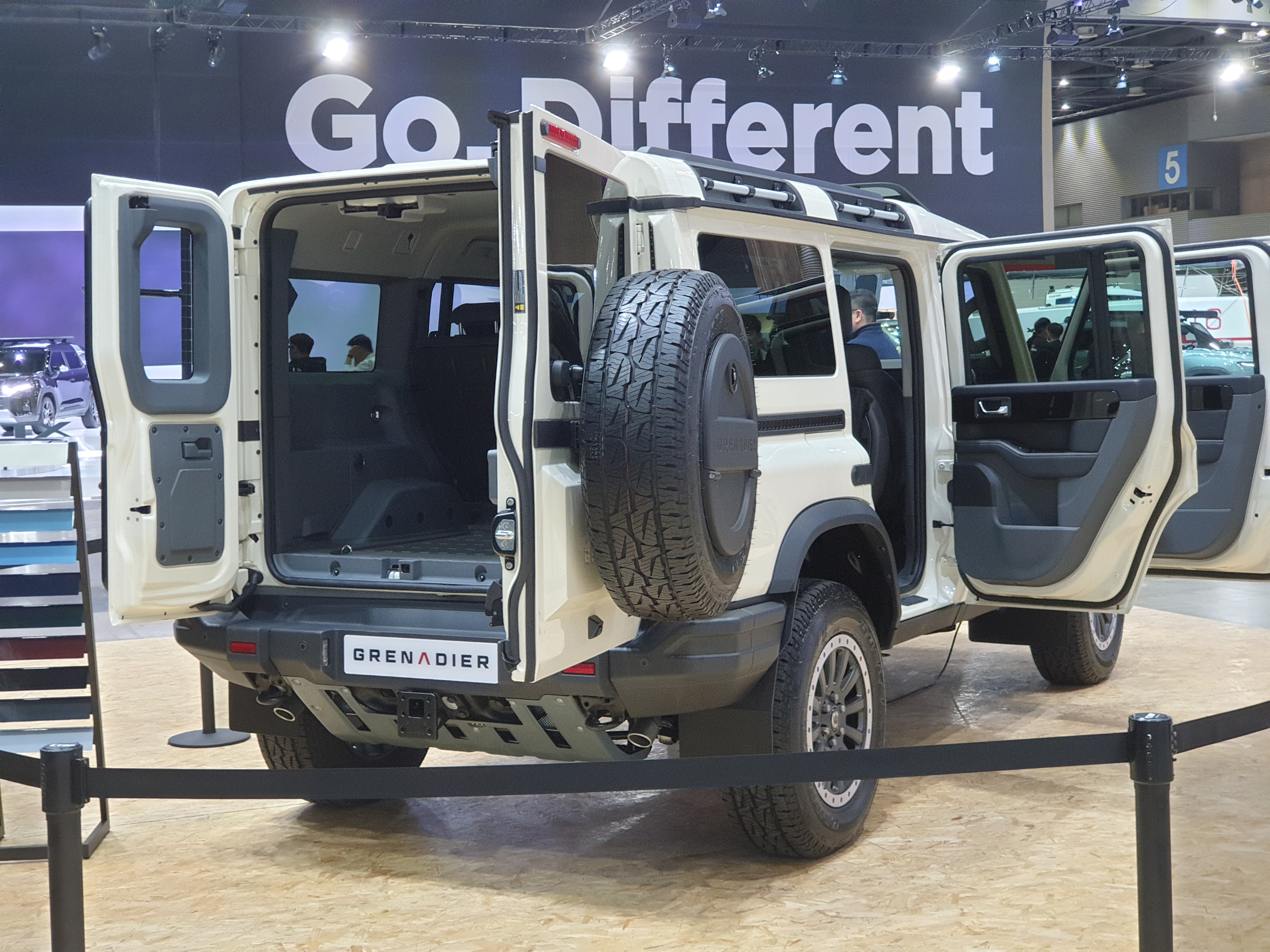
Grenadier rear with door opened

While the Grenadier is not a direct replica of a Land Rover Defender (it uses none of the original tooling or componentry), Toby Ecuyer made it clear that their mission was specifically to build a modern Defender, saying it was a 'massive shame' that the outgoing Defender was ceasing production. In an interview with Autocar UK, he explained that their mission initially began with trying to do just that. "We thought, well, we’ll replace it. Then we thought, let’s build a better one, something that doesn’t leak and is comfortable. After all, this isn’t 1948. We can move on." Speaking on how they would modernise the Defender's design he stated "That was when we started collecting similar vehicles – Bronco, Pajero, G-Wagen, various Jeeps – to see how other manufacturers had done it".

At the online launch, Toby Ecuyer, head of design at Ineos Automotive, said: "We had Jeeps, Land Rovers, Toyota Hiluxes, a Toyota Land Cruiser, Nissan Patrols, Ford Broncos. And we looked at vans, lorries, Unimogs, military vehicles, tractors. African-spec vehicles were particularly interesting. They all shaped our plan for a vehicle that would be extremely capable but also very honest and uncomplicated". The exterior design of the Grenadier was shown to the public for the first time in an online launch on 1 July 2020. At the launch Ratcliffe said "The Grenadier project started by identifying a gap in the market, abandoned by a number of manufacturers, for a utilitarian off-road vehicle. This gave us our engineering blueprint for a capable, durable and reliable 4x4 built to handle the world's harshest environments". Steve Cropley, editor-in-chief at Autocar said "The result is a simple, well-proportioned and familiar-looking off-roader." Ecuyer hoped that none of the inevitable discussion of the homage to the Defender's design obscures the unique and utilitarian design behind the Grenadier: the roof that doubles as a load rack, the roof tie bars (that go roughly where the Defender 110 has roof lights), the two-piece rear door, the exposed door hinges and the multi-purpose ‘utility rails’ that run along the exterior of the door panels where scuff bars would usually be placed.

Jaguar Land Rover brought a case based on trademark infringement but failed on a ruling that the similarity was insufficient.

The Grenadier is built on a box-section ladder frame chassis. There are heavy duty Carraro beam axles at each end, paired to five-link coil suspension supplied by Eibach offering nine degrees of front axle articulation and 12 degrees at the rear, and anti-roll bars for road handling.

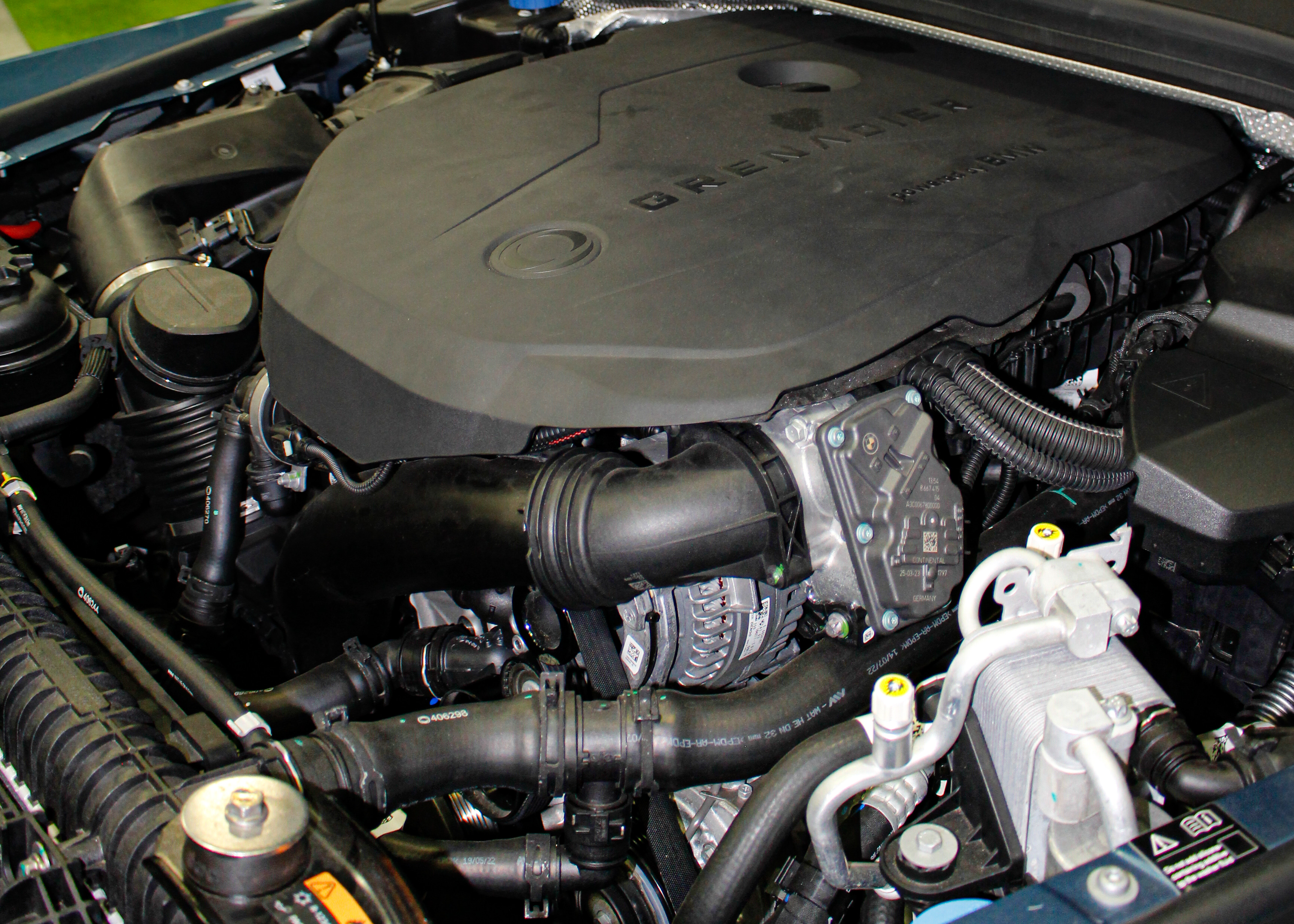
B58 engine in a Grenadier

The Grenadier is powered by a choice of BMW six-cylinder engines; the 3.0L BMW B58 inline 6 petrol engine and the 3.0L BMW B57 inline 6 diesel engine. In the Grenadier, the B57 diesel engine makes 183 kW (245 hp; 249 PS) of power (3250-4200rpm) and 550 N⋅m (406 lb⋅ft) of torque (1250-3000rpm). The B58 petrol engine makes 210 kW (282 hp; 286 PS) of power (4750rpm) and 450 N⋅m (332 lb⋅ft) of torque (1750-4000rpm).

Both engines come mated to a ZF eight-speed automatic transmission (codenamed 8HP51 for the petrol, 8HP76 for the diesel), with what Ineos calls a new "heavy duty" torque converter. All Grenadiers come standard with permanent four-wheel drive (4WD), with low-range accessed through a 2.5:1 Tremec two-speed transfer case.

=== Grenadier Quartermaster ===
In July 2023, Ineos introduced the Grenadier Quartermaster, a four-door pickup version of the Grenadier. Compared to the SUV version, its wheelbase has been stretched by 305 mm (12.0 in) to fit the bed, which has a maximum payload capacity of 760 kg (1,680 lb). The load bay measures 1,564 mm (61.6 in) long and 1,619 mm (63.7 in) wide, ensuring it can accommodate a standard Euro pallet. The Grenadier Quartermaster towing capacity is rated at 3,500 kg (7,700 lb), identical to the SUV version.

Despite the 25 percent import tariff imposed on light trucks built outside North America, the Grenadier Quartermaster is sold in the USA as of 2025.

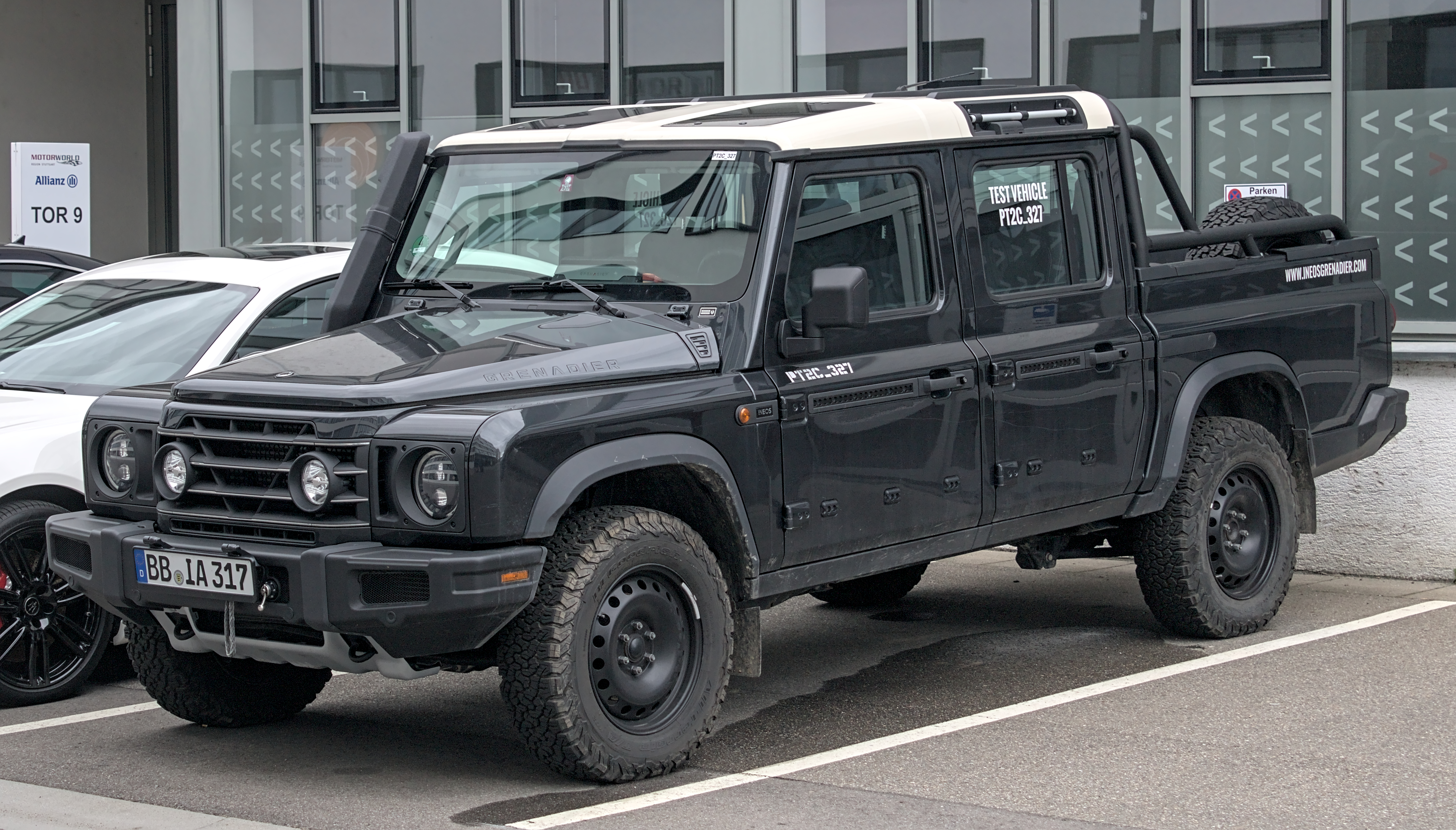
Ineos Grenadier Quartermaster

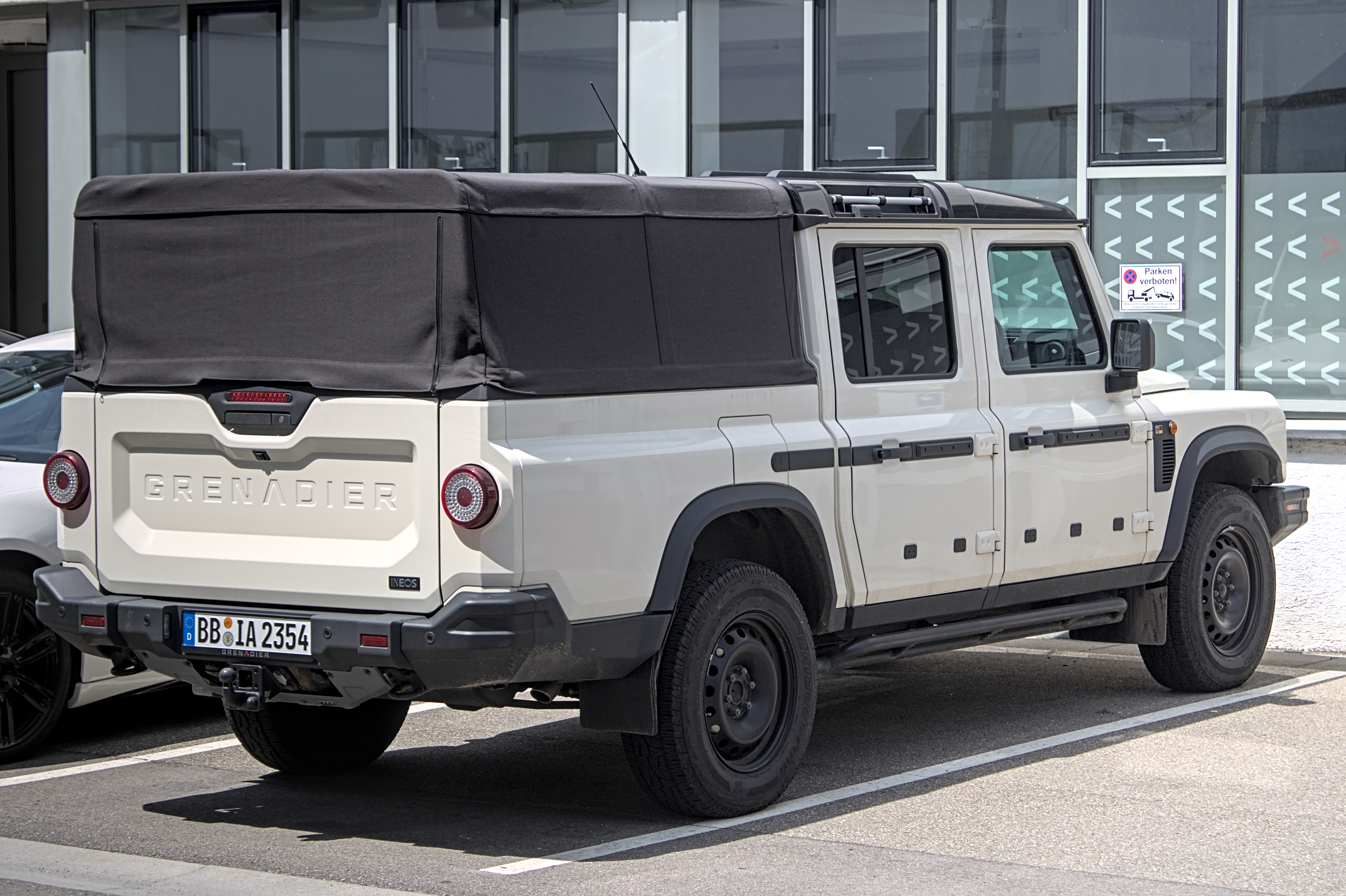
Rear view

== Future versions ==
=== Electric version ===
An electric model is scheduled to enter production in 2026, to be developed with the Canadian car parts manufacturer Magna International, which already builds vehicles for Mercedes-Benz, BMW, Jaguar Land Rover and the startup Fisker Inc. This Grenadier will be built in a factory in Graz, Austria, that already builds electric SUVs for Jaguar and Fisker.

=== Fuel cell version ===
Tennant said that internal combustion engines were best for "rough, tough jobs", and pointed out the need for good range and autonomy in remoter parts of the world, with hydrogen fuel cells part of the longer-term plan.

Deploying a hydrogen supply chain could benefit Ineos, which produces 300,000–400,000 tonnes of hydrogen a year.

=== Military version ===
Ineos are offering the Multi-Role Light Vehicle based on the Grenadier in response to the British Army's invitation to tender. In October 2026, the Ineos Grenadier was selected to be supplied to the Italian and Austrian armies, the off-roader’s first military customers.

=== Enhanced Protection Vehicle (EPV) ===
Ineos have developed an up-armoured variant, with ballistic protection offered up to STANAG 4569 Level 2, along with suspended flooring to provide a measure of mine blast mitigation. Due to being heavier, the chassis used by the EPV variant features improved suspension.

== Production ==
Calendar year	Total production
2022	?
2023	4,553
2024	8,000
