= Ineos Fusilier =

Overview
- Manufacturer: Ineos Automotive
- Production: TBA
- Assembly: Austria: Graz (Magna Steyr)

Body and chassis
- Class: Mid-size SUV
- Body style: 5-door SUV
- Layout: Front-engine, four-wheel-drive

Powertrain
- Hybrid drivetrain: Series hybrid

Dimensions
- Length: 178 in (4,521.2 mm)

The Ineos Fusilier is a planned mid-size SUV to be produced by the British automaker Ineos Automotive Ltd., a division of the petrochemical group Ineos. It was set to be assembled by Magna Steyr at its factory in Graz, Austria.

== History ==
The Fusilier was unveiled in images by the manufacturer on 23 February 2024 at the Grenadier pub in London. Production of the vehicle was scheduled to begin no earlier than 2027.

Ineos Automotive announced in early July 2024 that it had postponed production of the Fusilier due to low demand and regulatory changes.

== Specifications ==
The Fusilier was to be equipped with an electric motor powered by a battery, or a rechargeable gasoline-electric hybrid assembly consisting of a thermal engine acting as a range extender which did not drive the wheels but only recharged the battery. It was set to be offered as plug-in hybrid and electric vehicle.

The Ineos Fusilier would have differed from the Grenadier and Quartermaster models in that it would not feature body-on-frame construction or solid axles. Despite this, Ineos had stated that the Fusilier was being developed with significant off-road capability. As part of its testing and development, the vehicle was expected to undergo rigorous testing on Austria’s Schöckl mountain, a site historically used by Magna and Mercedes-Benz engineers to refine the off-road performance of the second-generation G-Class.
