= Project Kimber =

Project Kimber was the industry group which intended to restart production of the discontinued Smart Roadster car in the United Kingdom in 2006, following their unsuccessful bid for MG Rover Group in 2005.

== MG Cars ==
Following the demise of MG Rover Group in 2005, Project Kimber submitted an unsuccessful bid to buy the company out of administration. Project Kimber was named after Cecil Kimber, MG's founder.

During the bid process, David James was quoted as saying: "This is the last chance to save Britain's largest independent carmaker from falling into overseas ownership."

== Smart Roadster/AC Ace ==
In 2006, David James entered talks with MG Rover's new owners the Nanjing Automobile Group to buy the MG brand in order to produce a number of sports cars based on the out of production Smart Roadster design following discussions with DaimlerChrysler to buy the Roadster's design, technology and equipment for approximately £13 million. The equipment would then be transferred from the Smart factory to a former Dunlop tyre factory in Coventry where the Roadster would be built under the MG brand. It was understood that Project Kimber was being funded by Grant Gazdig's Access-Capital firm, as well as a private equity firm called European American Securities. Barrie Wills, another key member of Project Kimber, formerly of Jaguar, Reliant Scimitar and DeLorean, and founder of de Montfort Resources which held the Agreements with Smart.

On 20 July 2006 motoring website 4car reported rumours that David James was in talks with Alan Lubinsky, the owner of AC Cars, to use the famous British name on his sports cars. In a press release dated 31 August 2006 it was stated that agreement had been reached with Acedes Holdings, the current owners of the AC brand, to use the AC name on the new car.

On 4 September 2006, AutoWired reported that engineer Gordon Murray, who created the McLaren F1, was to lead the Project Kimber engineering team. Also joining was John Piper, formerly of the Williams Formula One team who recently worked on the JCB Dieselmax car which in August 2006 set a new diesel land speed record. The revised car was to use a 1.0 litre, three-cylinder Mitsubishi Motors engine in both normally aspirated (71bhp) and turbocharged (84bhp) forms as used in the Mitsubishi i. Also the original Smart clutchless transmission was to be replaced by a Getrag-supplied manual gearbox.

Though remaining similar to the Smart original, the Roadster was planned to have minor makeover. Former Jaguar designer Keith Helfet was signed up to restyle its front and tail ends to freshen it up, and to distinguish it from the original Smart Roadster. Artists impressions of the new car, now referred to as the AC Ace, were released in December 2006, and while delays to the project were acknowledged at the end of 2006, production was scheduled for 2007 despite a £65m investment not being formalised.

The tooling brought from the Smart factory at Hambach was planned to be installed at Project Kimber's factory in South Wales and production was expected to start in the summer of 2007, but by June 2007, Barrie Wills, chief executive of the Project Kimber consortium admitted they were "still soldiering on with funding Project Kimber" but with no sign of prototypes or production vehicles.

Prices for the new AC were expected to start at £13,000 with 8,000 Roadsters planned to be built in the first year of production. By December 2008 Project Kimber's official site appeared to have been closed down and in April 2009 a new AC Ace V8 project was announced in Auto Express suggesting that the Kimber Project deal had fallen through.
