= The Grenadier =

Pub in Belgravia, London

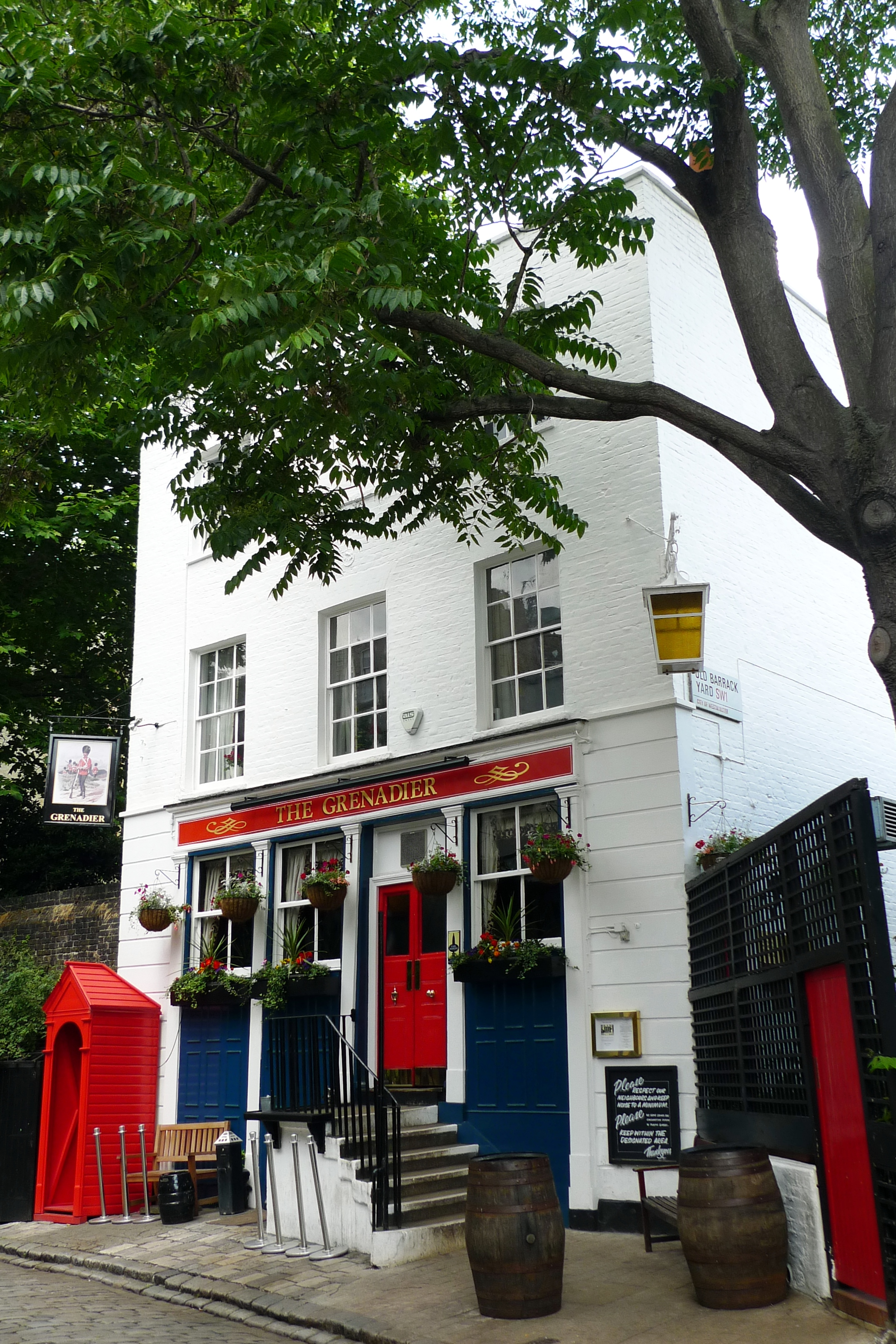
- The Grenadier in 2011

- Location within City of Westminster Location within Greater London

General information
- Location: 18 Wilton Row, London, England
- Coordinates: 51.5014°N 0.1549°W
- Estimated completion: 1720

Website
- www.grenadierbelgravia.com

The Grenadier is a public house in Belgravia, London. It was originally built in 1720 as the officers' mess for the senior infantry regiment of the British army, the 1st Regiment of Foot Guards, and located in a courtyard of their barracks. It was opened to the public in 1818 as The Guardsman, and subsequently renamed in honour of the Grenadier Guards' actions in the Battle of Waterloo.

Being secluded in a wealthy district of London, it was frequented in the past by the Duke of Wellington and King George IV. More recent customers have included Madonna and Prince William. It is also said to be haunted by the ghost of a subaltern who was beaten to death for cheating at cards.

In 2022, the pub was bought by Ineos, being the favourite pub of Jim Ratcliffe, the founder of Ineos. The Ineos Grenadier motor car, and in turn the Ineos Grenadiers cycling team, are named after it.
