= Ecofly M160 =

Automotive engine for aircraft use

M160
- Type: Aircraft engine
- National origin: Germany
- Manufacturer: Ecofly GmbH
- Designer: Otto Funk

The Ecofly M160 is a German aircraft engine, adapted by Otto Funk from a Smart Car engine and produced by Ecofly of Böhl-Iggelheim for use in ultralight aircraft.

== Design and development ==
Funk adapted the engine starting in 2001, with the cooperation of Daimler Chrysler. Mercedes-Benz and its Smart Car division provided assistance with adapting the engine control unit. The initial installation was in a flying school B&F Fk9 and this later resulted in a production model of the Fk9, called the Fk9 Smart.

The engine is a three-cylinder, in-line, turbocharged, four-stroke, 698 cc (42.6 cu in) displacement, liquid-cooled, automotive conversion gasoline engine design, with a toothed poly V belt reduction drive. It produces 100 hp (75 kW) at 5600 rpm, with a compression ratio of 9.5:1.

== Applications ==
- B&F Fk9

== Specifications (M160) ==
Data from Tacke

=== General characteristics ===
- Type: Three-cylinder, four stroke, turbocharged gasoline aircraft engine
- Bore: 68 mm (2.7 in)
- Stroke: 66 mm (2.6 in)
- Displacement: 698 cc (42.6 cu in)
- Dry weight: 57 kg (125.7 lb)

=== Components ===
- Fuel type: gasoline
- Cooling system: liquid
- Reduction gear: toothed poly V belt
- turbocharger

=== Performance ===
- Power output: 100 hp (75 kW)
- Compression ratio: 9.5:1

== See also ==
Related lists

- List of aircraft engines
