= Hambach, Moselle =

Hambach
- Commune
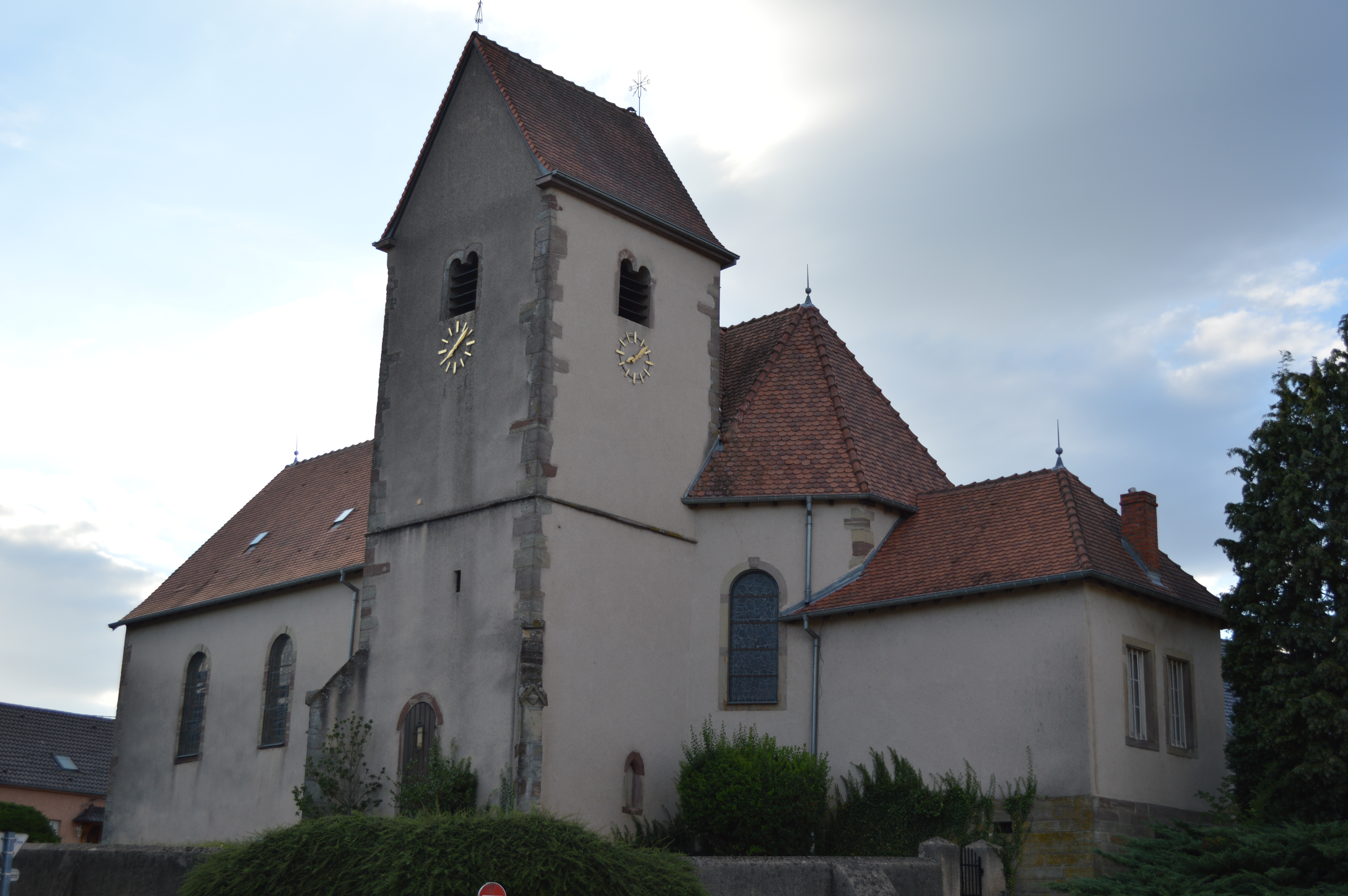
- The church in Hambach

- Coat of arms
- Location of Hambach
- Location within France Location within Grand Est
- Coordinates: 49°03′41″N 7°02′14″E
- Country: France
- Region: Grand Est
- Department: Moselle
- Arrondissement: Sarreguemines
- Canton: Sarreguemines
- Intercommunality: CA Sarreguemines Confluences

Government
  - Mayor (2020–2026): Daniel Muller
- Area^{1}: 17.6 km^{2} (6.8 sq mi)
- Highest elevation: 281 m (922 ft)
- Lowest elevation: 213 m (699 ft)
- Population (2023): 2,766
  - Density: 157/km^{2} (407/sq mi)
- Time zone: UTC+01:00 (CET)
  - Summer (DST): UTC+02:00 (CEST)
- INSEE/Postal code: 57289 /57910
- ^{1} French Land Register data, which excludes lakes, ponds, glaciers > 1 km^{2} (0.386 sq mi or 247 acres) and river estuaries.

Hambach (French pronunciation: [ambax]; Lorraine Franconian: Hombach) is a town and commune in the Moselle department in Grand Est in north-eastern France. It belongs to the historic region of Lorraine and is close to Sarreguemines and the German border.

The major manufacturing plant of British company Ineos Automotive, who are building the Grenadier 4x4, is located in Hambach.

== Population ==
Historical population
Year	Pop.	±% p.a.
1968	1,887	—
1975	2,002	+0.85%
1982	2,135	+0.92%
1990	2,152	+0.10%
1999	2,501	+1.68%
2007	2,695	+0.94%
2012	2,767	+0.53%
2017	2,886	+0.85%
2023	2,766	−0.71%
Source: INSEE

== History ==
Because of its historically disputed location in Lorraine, Hambach switched several times between Germany and France.

- 1200 – 1766: Kingdom of Germany as part of Holy Roman Empire
- 1766 – 1871: France
- 1871 – 1918: German Empire
- 1918 – 1940: France
- 1940 – 1944: Nazi Germany
- since 1945: France

== See also ==
- Communes of the Moselle department
