= Mercedes-Benz M160 engine =

Mercedes-Benz M160
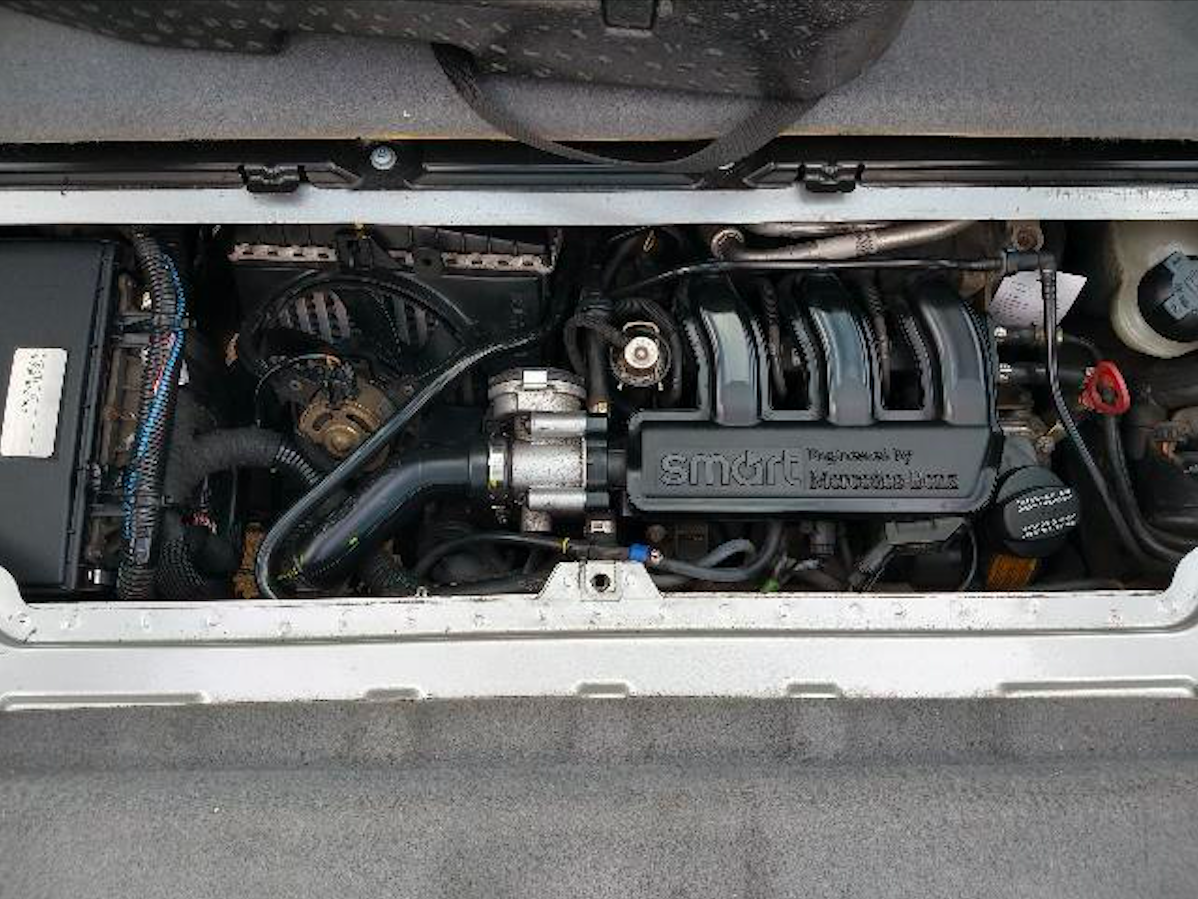

Overview
- Manufacturer: Mercedes-Benz
- Production: 1998–2007

Layout
- Configuration: Straight-three engine
- Displacement: 0.6 L (599 cc); 0.7 L (698 cc)
- Cylinder bore: 63.5 mm (2.50 in) (0.6 L); 66.5 mm (2.62 in) (0.7 L)
- Piston stroke: 63 mm (2.48 in) (0.6 L); 67 mm (2.64 in) (0.7 L)
- Cylinder block material: Aluminium alloy
- Cylinder head material: Aluminium alloy
- Valvetrain: SOHC
- Compression ratio: 9.5:1

Combustion
- Turbocharger: Single-turbo
- Fuel system: Fuel injection
- Fuel type: Gasoline
- Cooling system: Water cooled

Output
- Power output: 33–74 kW (45–101 PS; 44–99 hp)
- Torque output: 70–130 N⋅m (52–96 lb⋅ft)

Dimensions
- Dry weight: 59 kg (130 lb)

Chronology
- Successor: Mitsubishi 3B2 engine

The M160 is a turbocharged inline-three engine produced by Mercedes-Benz for use in Smart vehicles, from 1998 to 2007.

== Design ==
M160 engines are rear mounted and mated to a 6-speed automated manual transmission. They are branded under the Suprex name. It was launched in 1998 with a single overhead camshaft, 2 valves per cylinder, a three-way catalytic converter, and a Garrett GT12 turbocharger. From 2003, it was succeeded by a 0.7 L version featuring an increased bore and stroke and performance improvements.

== Models ==
Engine	Displacement	Power	Torque	Years
M160; E06 LA	0.6 L (599 cc)	33 kW (45 PS; 44 hp) at 5,250 rpm	70 N⋅m (52 lb⋅ft) at 3,000 rpm	1998–2002
M160; E06 LA	0.6 L (599 cc)	37 kW (50 PS; 50 hp) at 5,250 rpm	80 N⋅m (59 lb⋅ft) at 2,000 rpm	1998–2003
M160; E06 LA	0.6 L (599 cc)	45 kW (61 PS; 60 hp) at 5,250 rpm	88 N⋅m (65 lb⋅ft) at 2,250 rpm	2000–2003
M160; E06 LA	0.6 L (599 cc)	53 kW (72 PS; 71 hp) at 5,470 rpm	108 N⋅m (80 lb⋅ft) at 2,200 rpm	2002–2003
M160; E07 LA	0.7 L (698 cc)	37 kW (50 PS; 50 hp) at 5,250 rpm	80 N⋅m (59 lb⋅ft) at 1,800 rpm	2003–2006
M160; E07 LA	0.7 L (698 cc)	46 kW (63 PS; 62 hp) at 5,250 rpm	95 N⋅m (70 lb⋅ft) at 2,000–4,000 rpm	2003–2006
M160; E07 LA	0.7 L (698 cc)	61 kW (83 PS; 82 hp) at 5,250 rpm	110 N⋅m (81 lb⋅ft) at 2,250–4,500 rpm	2003–2006
M160; E07 LA	0.7 L (698 cc)	74 kW (101 PS; 99 hp) at 5,250 rpm	130 N⋅m (96 lb⋅ft) at 2,500–5,300 rpm	2004–2006

=== M160 E06 LA ===
- 1998–2003 Smart City Coupé (33, 37 kW)
- 2000–2003 Smart City Cabrio (37, 45 kW)
- 2002–2003 Smart Crossblade (53 kW)

=== M160 E07 LA ===
- 2003–2006 Smart Fortwo (37, 46 kW)
- 2003–2006 Smart Roadster (46, 61 kW)
- 2003–2006 Smart ForTwo Brabus (61 kW)
- 2004–2006 Smart Roadster Brabus (74 kW)
