= Smartville, Hambach, France =

Factory in Hambach, France

Coordinates: 49°02′58″N 7°02′31″E

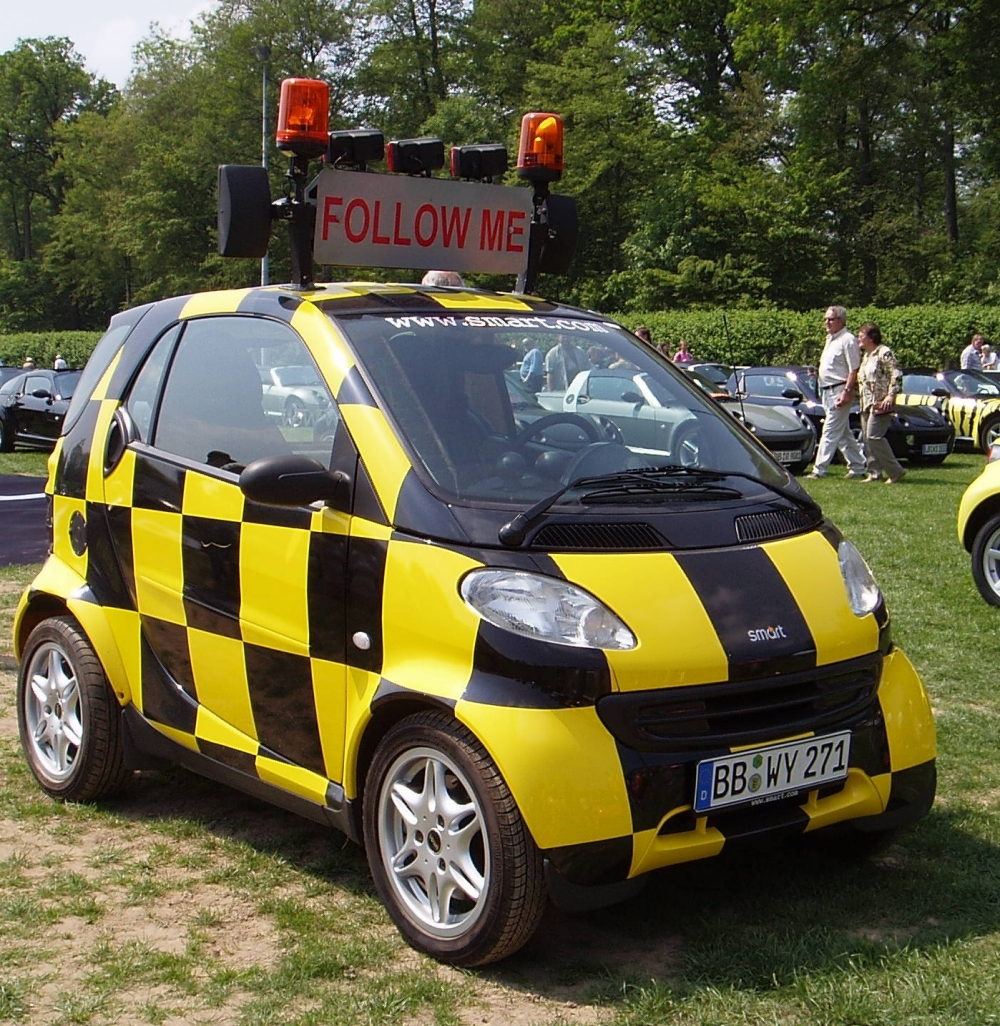
Smart "fortwo" special purpose vehicle "Follow me"

Smartville is a purpose-built factory complex in Hambach, France, established in 1994 as a joint venture of Daimler-Benz and the Swiss watch manufacturer Swatch to produce the Smart car. In 2020 the plant was 100% owned by Daimler AG (at that point comprising both the Mercedes-Benz and Daimler Truck companies) and was taken over by Ineos for production of the Ineos Grenadier 4x4.

The "Smartville" production site in Hambach with its 2,000 workers was among the most modern automobile production plants. It had been built for 450 million Euros and started production in 1998. The plant is arranged in the shape of a cross to optimize movement; in each of its four extensions different assembly works are provided. The centre, the so-called market place, serves as a test room for completed vehicles and for refinishing operations. The centre is multi-storied; thereby all the administrative, IT and changing rooms could be implemented in one central place.

Approximately 1,300 jobs were retained following the purchase by Ineos.

== Smart ==
The factory was officially opened in 1997 in the presence of Jacques Chirac and Helmut Kohl.

The decision to locate the plant in French Hambach rather than the Black Forest site in Lahr (which had also been seriously evaluated) was made for several reasons. Lorraine and the region around Hambach were shaped by the heavy industry in former times. With the decay of this economic branch a considerable proportion of the population became unemployed. From the EU funds for economically underdeveloped regions as well as from the French government appropriations for an industry settling were available that would not have been provided in Lahr. The high unemployment provided the advantage of a high labor potential for a substantial new manufacturing plant. The Hambach site was closer to the Autoroute than the Lahr site would have been, though both sites are well served by Autobahn connections. Finally pivotal were the vast area reserve and the lower wage level in Lorraine. Calculations resulted in 75 Euros lower production costs for one Smart at the French production site than on the German site. Modern Toyota-inspired production philosophy also necessitated a large surrounding land area so that key suppliers could have their own assembly or warehousing facilities on the same site as the Smart plant.

Smart is the company with the lowest in-house production depth in the automobile sector. It accounts only for 10%, most other manufacturers often still have 20–40%. This means that 90% of the production steps to the complete car are performed by component suppliers.

To bring this concept to perfection, most of the suppliers were settled with their own production sites around the "Smart" plant in Hambach. The auto body manufacturer Magna International produces the chassis from parts that are delivered from the Daimler plant in Sindelfingen. Siemens VDO produces the entire cockpit, the cable trees and the batteries. ThyssenKrupp Automotive delivers the entire propulsion unit. The tire sets are delivered by Continental. The delivery of entire modules is also called Modular Sourcing. The buildings for the component suppliers were built and provided by the company Smart in order to facilitate plant construction for component suppliers at the location.

The Smart-assembly is implemented without any stock-keeping, all parts are delivered just-in-time and even just-in-sequence; this means that all component suppliers have access to the individual order data of every vehicle and that they deliver the parts in exactly the order as is required in the Smart-plant. Since Smart produces vehicles only on order, the completed vehicles, too are stored for few days only before they are delivered into the particular smart-Centers via a company-owned railway station. After the vehicles have been completed their proper operation is verified in several tests, for example an engine test, a gasket test, and on a shake test track. Possible problems during production are solved by 50 employed maintenance specialists. The closeness of component suppliers allows for the maintenance of delivered parts by the particular outside companies.

Work is done in two shifts in which one vehicle has a throughput time of 8 ½ hours; the final assembly takes 4 ½ hours. The production capacity is at about 750 units per day. To keep the motivation of the workers on a high level eight of them at a time are organized in teams. These teams have a relatively flat hierarchy. Every week the production is halted for a quarter of an hour to allow the teams for a reflection. Furthermore, through the participation system "Eureka", all personnel have the opportunity to turn in suggestions for improvement concerning the production flow or of common nature. The best ideas are awarded with a bonus. Even the tidiness of the particular sections of the individual teams is recorded and awarded.

== Ineos ==
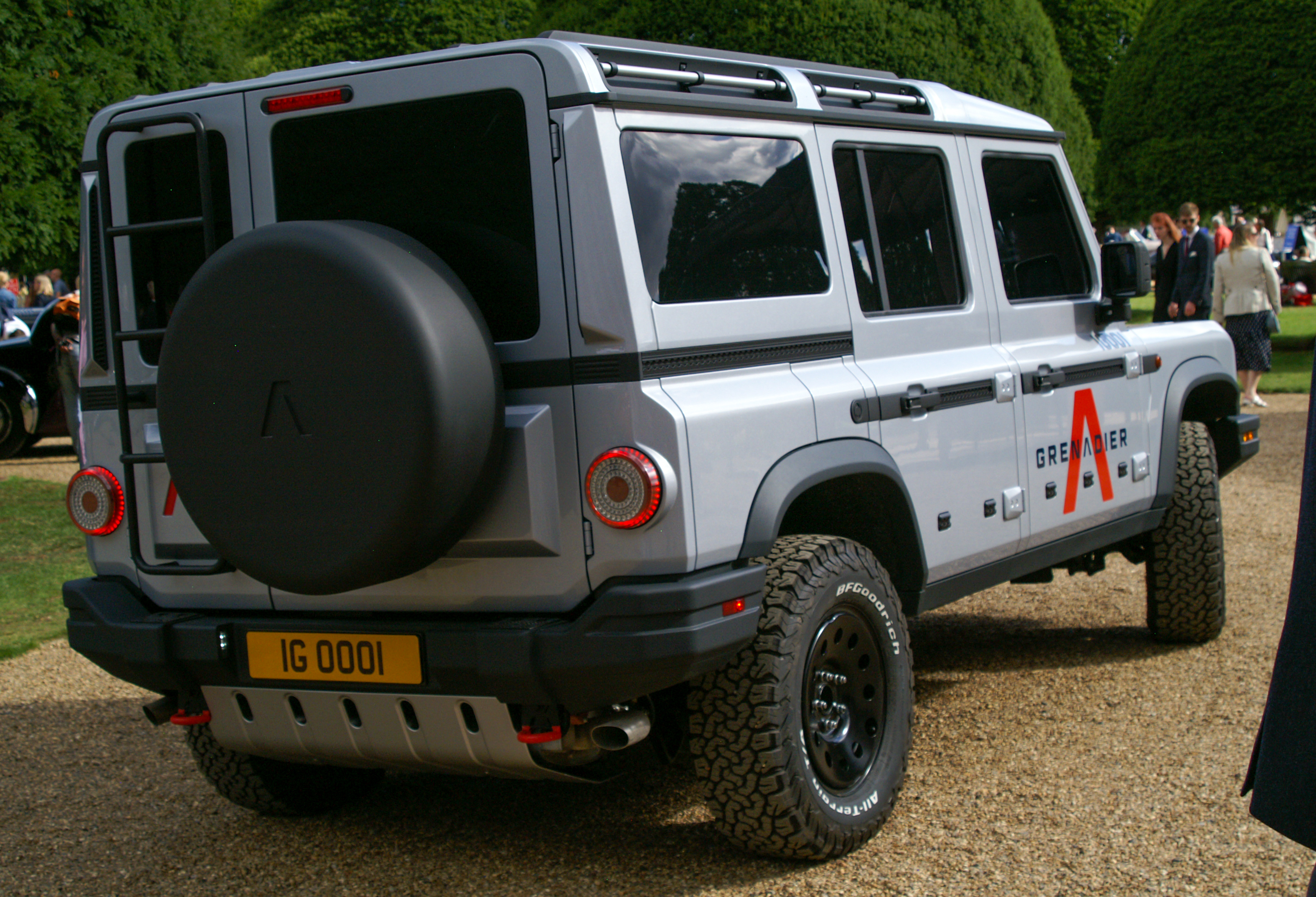
Ineos Grenadier 3.0

In July 2020, Daimler AG announced its interest in selling the factory.

On 8 December 2020, Ineos announced they had purchased the plant from Daimler in order to build their new off-road vehicle, the Ineos Grenadier. This replaced plans to establish two completely new car plants in Bridgend and Estarreja with Ineos saying the business case for the already established Hambach plant was "overwhelming". Ineos will continue to produce some models from the Smart range on a contract basis.
