= Smart electric drive =

Smart EQ
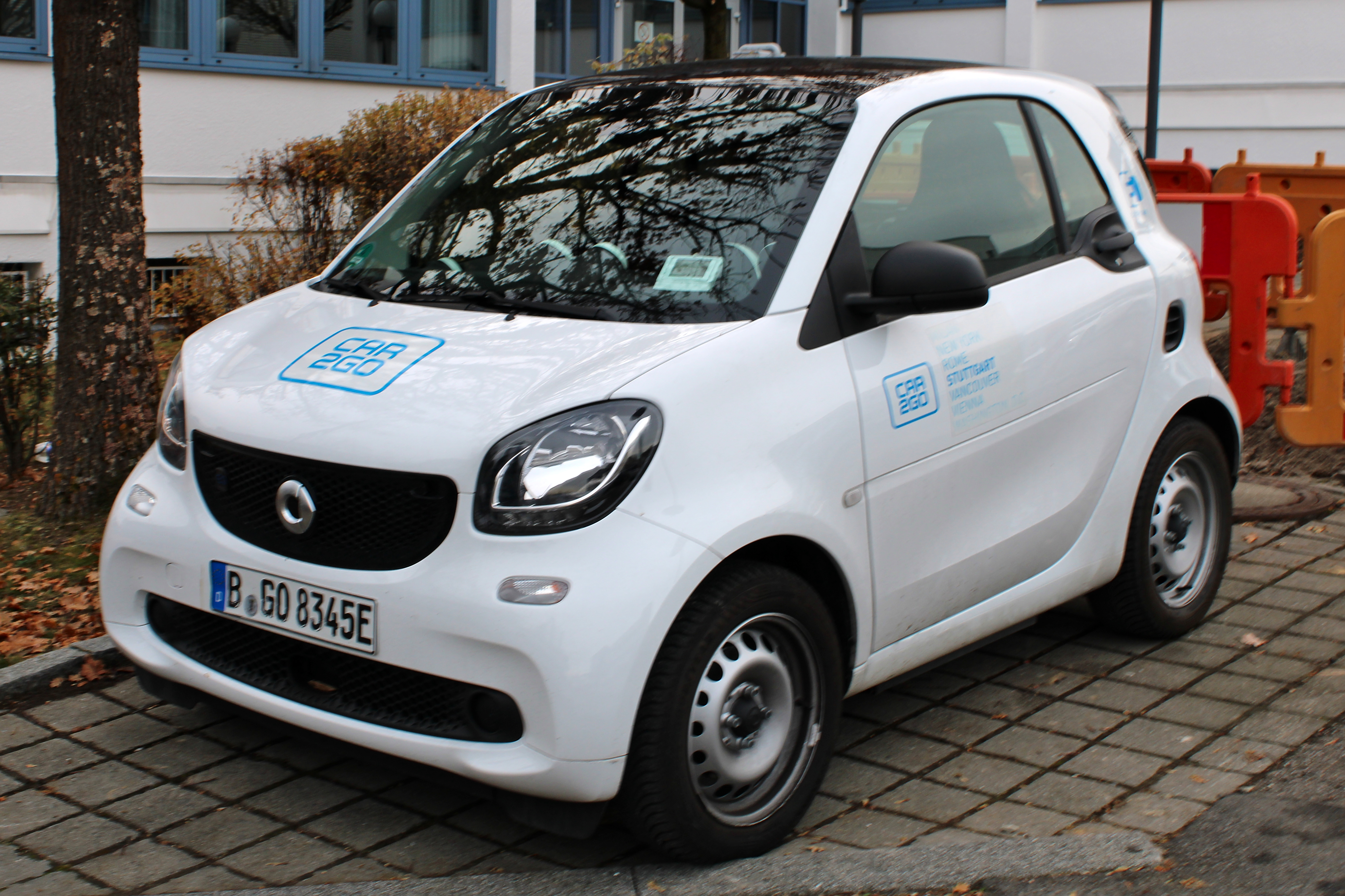
- Smart EQ Fortwo

Overview
- Manufacturer: Daimler AG
- Also called: Smart Fortwo electric drive Smart ED
- Production: 2007 (100); 2009–2012 (2,000); 2013–2016; 2017–2024

Body and chassis
- Body style: EQ Fortwo: 3-door hatchback; 2-door convertible; EQ Forfour: 5-door hatchback

Powertrain
- Electric motor: Brushless DC Motor; Permanent Magnet AC Synchronous motor (PMSM)

The Smart EQ Fortwo, formerly Smart Fortwo electric drive, smart ed or Smart Fortwo EV, is a battery electric vehicle variant of the Smart Fortwo city car made by Smart. Since 2020, Smart is only selling battery EVs.

The Smart EQ Forfour was an electric variant of the long wheelbase four-door second generation Smart Forfour city car Type 453 which shared approximately 70% of its parts with the third-generation Renault Twingo, both built by Renault in Slovenia.

Field testing of the electric Smart Fortwo 450 began in London with 100 units in 2007, leasing only due to the early molten salt ZEBRA battery. With a lithium-ion battery provided by a California startup named Tesla, the second-generation ED with the second-generation 451 chassis was introduced in 2009 and made available in 18 markets around the world for leasing, or through the Car2Go carsharing service in selected cities, with over 2,300 units delivered.

A near production version of the third-generation Smart ED, using the face lift 451 body and drive train plus complete Li-Ion battery built by Daimler joint ventures, was unveiled at the September 2011 Frankfurt Motor Show. Smart started in 2012 to mass-produce the electric car for regular availability in up to 30 markets worldwide. Deliveries of the third-generation Smart ED began in the U.S. and Europe in May 2013. More than 8,800 units of the second and third generation Smart ED were sold in North America and Europe between 2009 and June 2014, of which, over 6,500 units are third generation variants.

Since 2017, the fourth-generation Smart Electric Drive is being sold. As Daimler discontinued the electric joint ventures, it uses a Renault drive train, the fourth variant in as many electric generations. The body corresponds to the third-generation ICE-powered Smart 453; this mismatch in the numbering of generations arose because the Smart ED2 and the Smart ED3 were both based on the second-generation ICE-powered Smart 451.

== First generation ==
The first Smart electric drive vehicles, still using the first generation type 450 body style, were modified by Zytek Electric Vehicles. They were powered by a rear-mounted 55kW brushless DC motor that sat where the gas engine would otherwise be mounted and drove the rear wheels. The motor was tuned to 30kW for smooth power delivery and was connected to a modified transmission, locked in 2nd gear. It ran on 13.2 kilowatt hours of sodium-nickel chloride Zebra batteries manufactured by MES-DEA of Switzerland. These types of molten salt batteries operate at 245 °C (473 °F). It is typically kept molten and ready for use because if allowed to "freeze" it takes twelve hours to reheat and charge. Thus it is not very useful for private owners, but rather in fleets of taxis, police cars and other vehicles that are operated by multiple users.

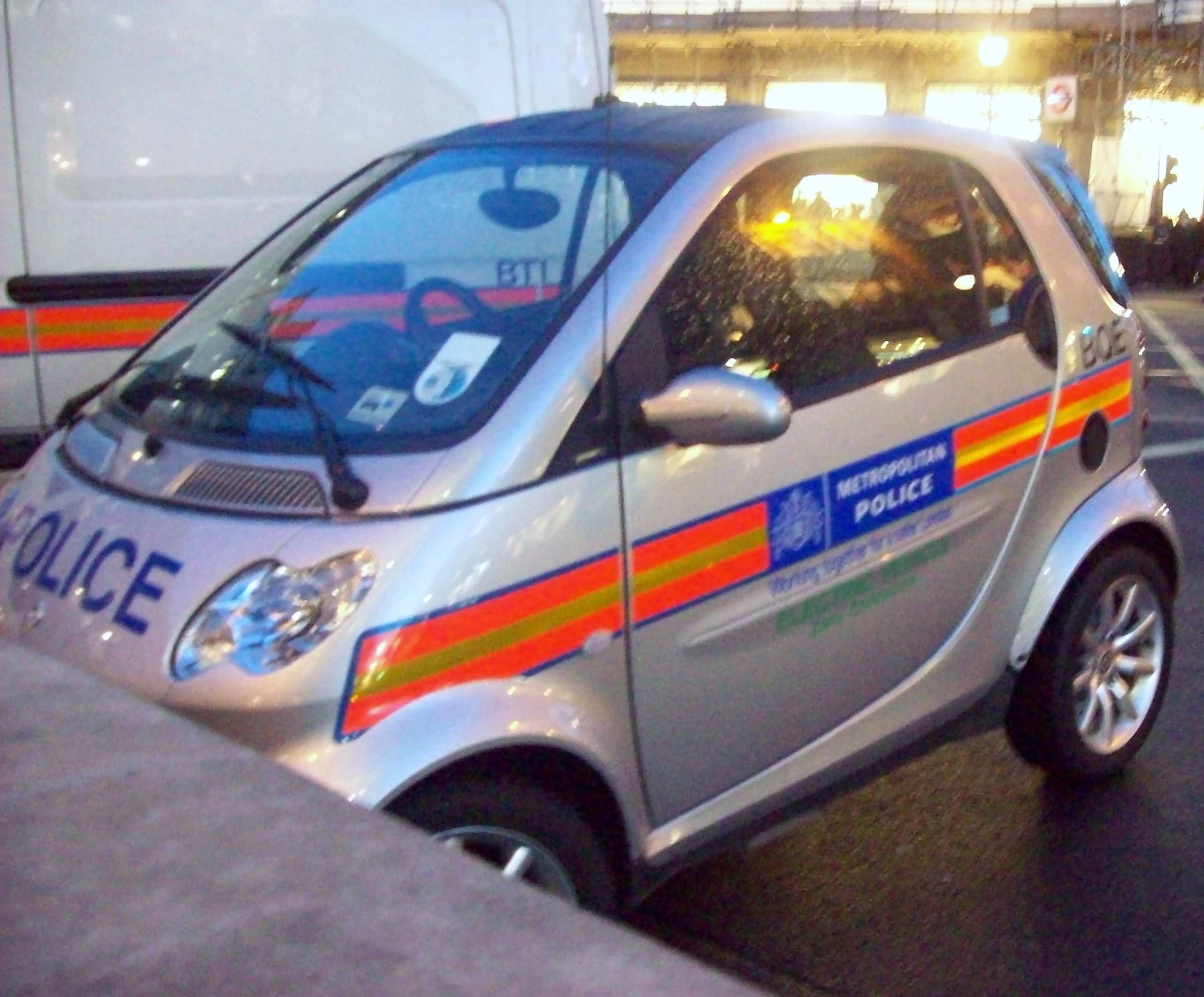
A Smart ED Police Car in central London in 2008

Field testing began in London with 100 vehicles in 2007 and was available only for lease to corporate clients for £375 per month.

=== Specifications ===
- Power: 30 kW (40 hp)
- Torque: 120 newton-metres (89 lbf⋅ft)
- Battery capacity: 13.2 kWh sodium-nickel chloride Zebra batteries
- Economy: 12 kilowatt-hours per 100 kilometres (430 kJ/km or 190 W·h/mi)
- Range: 110 kilometres (68 mi)
- Recharge time (80%): four hours
- Recharge time (100%): eight hours
- Top speed:120 kilometres per hour (75 miles per hour)

== Second generation ==
The second generation, Smart ED2, was introduced in 2009 to 18 markets with the objective to gather experience about how customers use and charge electric vehicles. Daimler initially planned to build 1,000 vehicles, but as demand exceeded the company's expectations, more than 2,000 Smart Fortwo electric drive cars were produced. The electric cars were available for leasing or through the Car2Go carsharing service in San Diego, Amsterdam and Vancouver, but were never sold to the public and were returned after 4 years. Production of the second-generation Smart Fortwo electric drive began in November 2009 in Smartville, Hambach, France. The Smart ED2s have a 16.5 kilowatt-hours (59 MJ) lithium-ion battery provided by Tesla, Inc. and a powertrain provided by Zytek. The range of a fully charged battery is up to 135 kilometres (84 miles) under the New European Driving Cycle (NEDC) cycle.

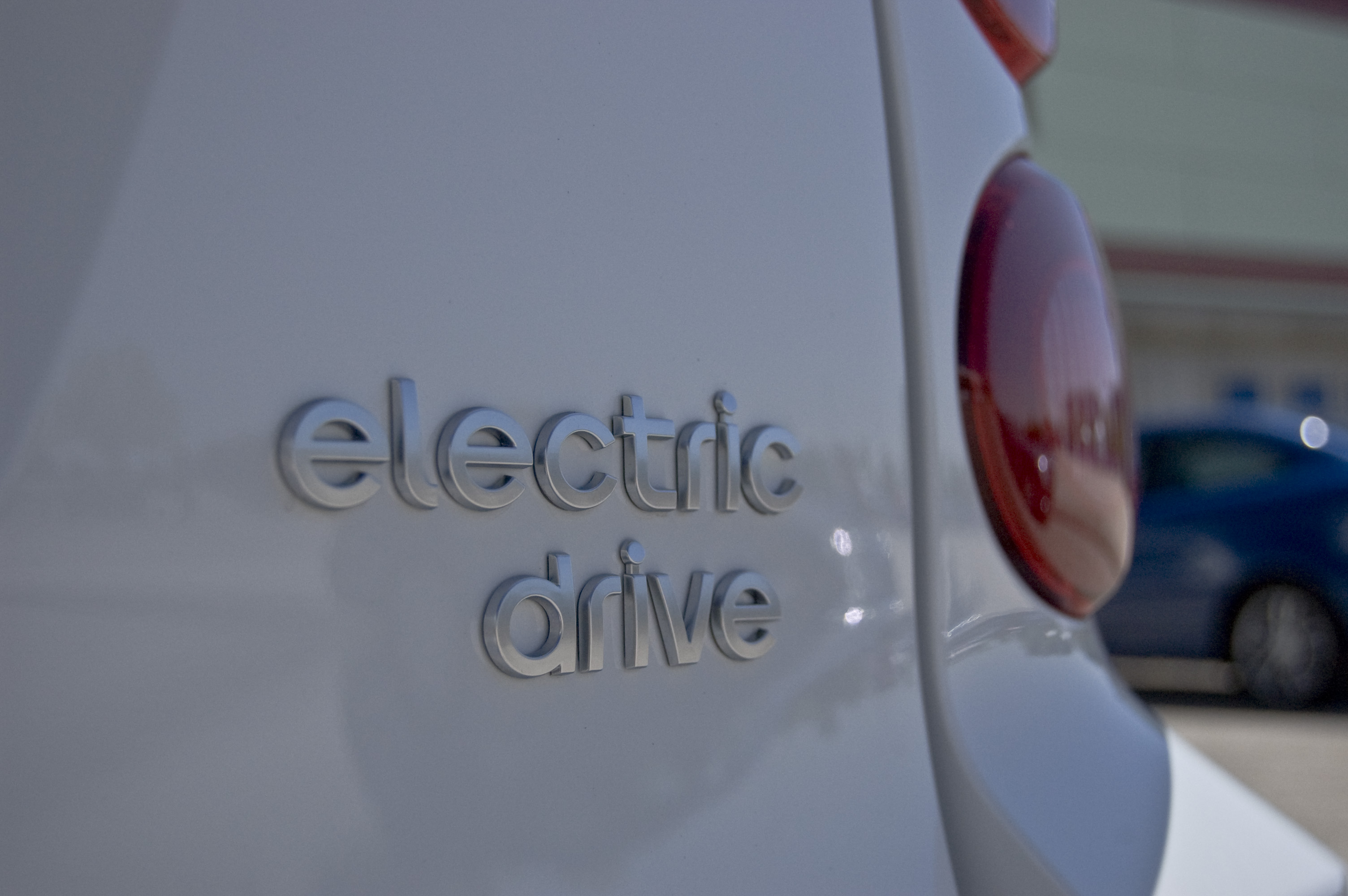
Smart Fortwo "electric drive" badge

As part of a three-phase roll-out program, phase two began with field testing in Berlin in December 2009 with 100 units out of 300 that will be deployed in Germany. For phase two 1,500 cars were produced, and field tested in Hamburg, Paris, Rome, Milan, Pisa, London, the English Midlands, Madrid, Zurich, Portugal, Denmark, the Czech Republic, Austria, Belgium and the Netherlands during the first half of 2010. In October 2010, 250 units were made available for field testing in several cities in the United States. Testing also was conducted in Canada; and in 2011 in selected markets in Asia.

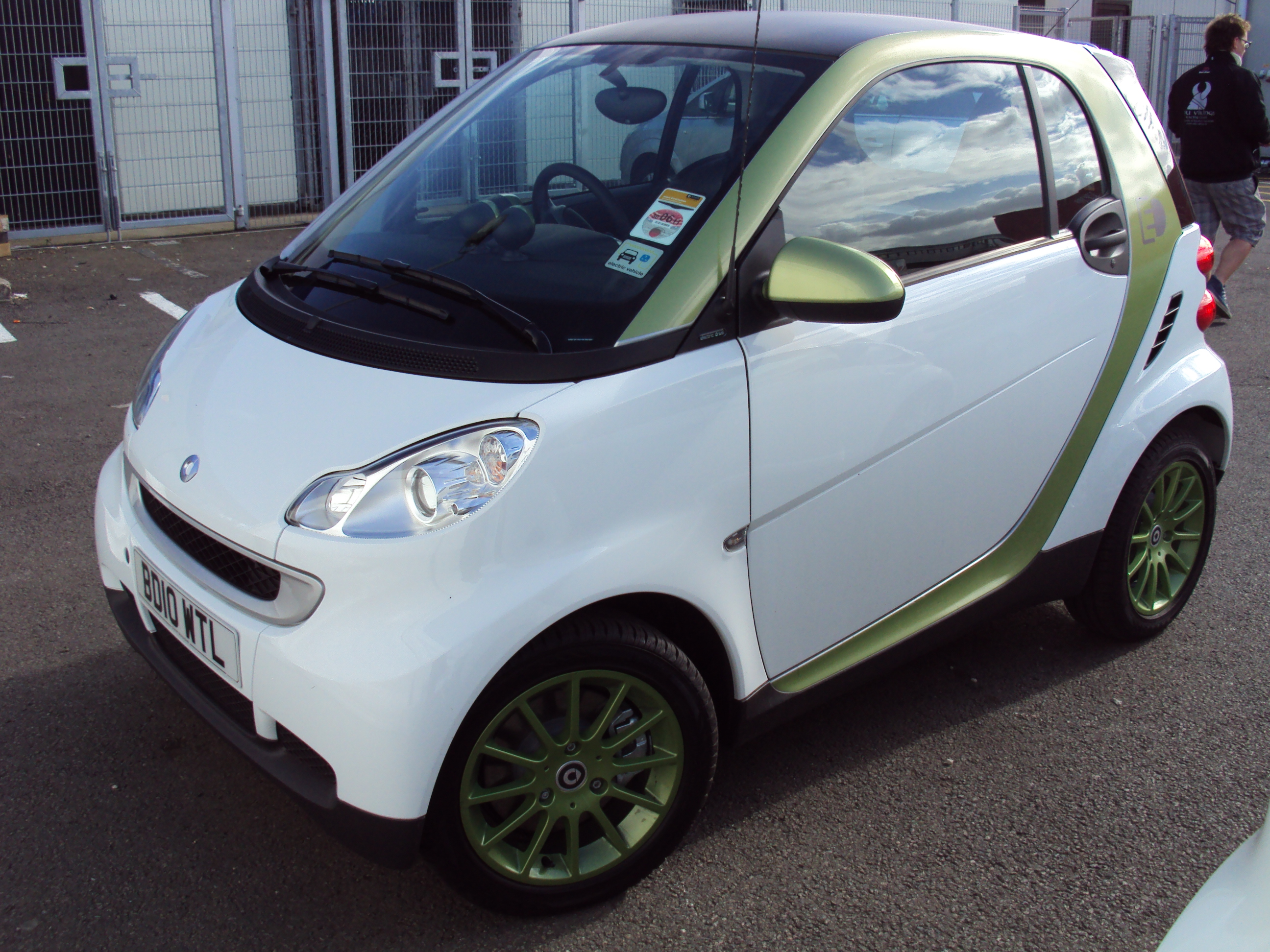
2011 Smart ED2 frontal view

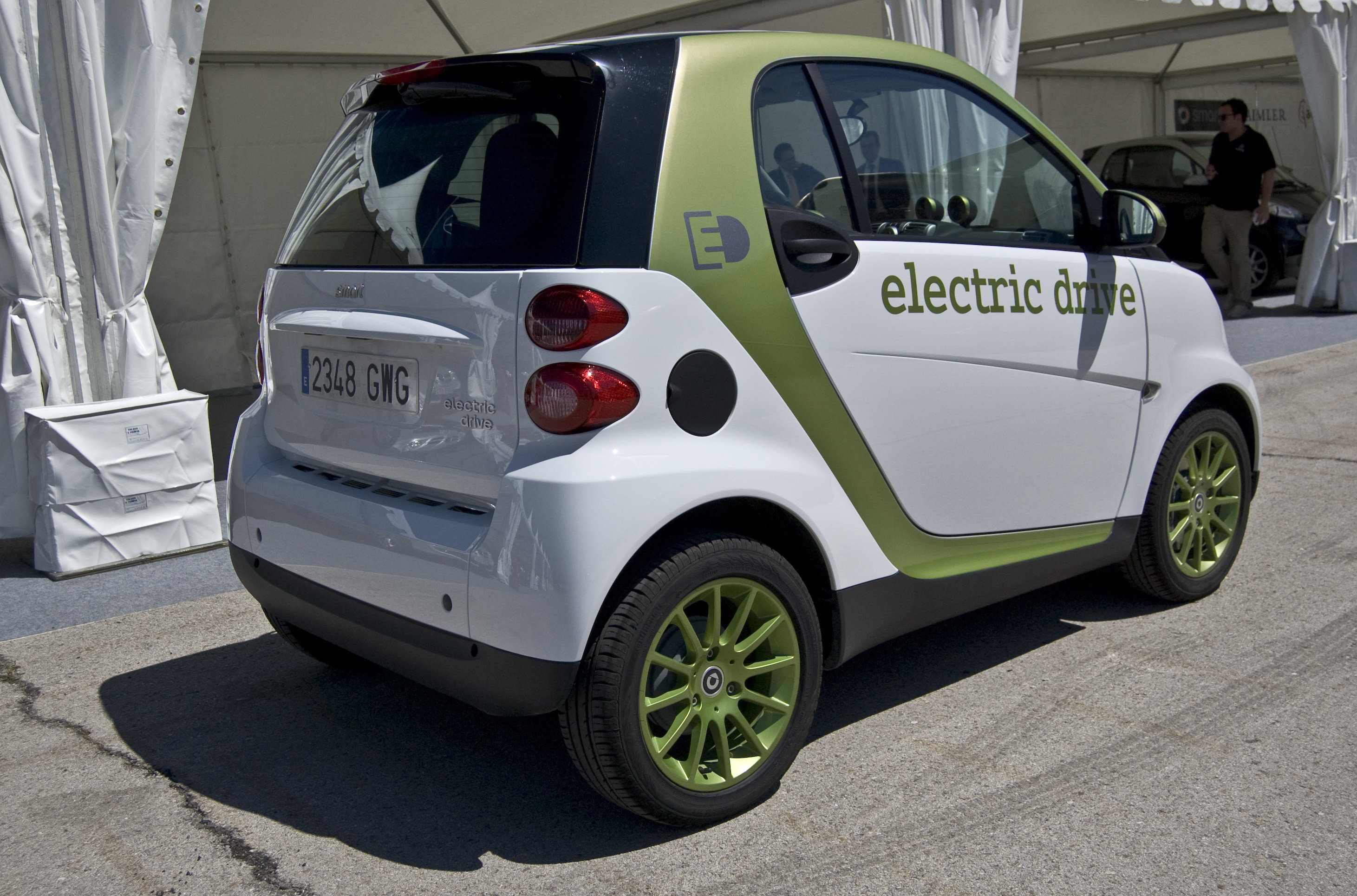
2011 Smart ED2 rear view

Phase three of the program is mass production, which was scheduled to begin with the 2012 model year. In the United States sales were scheduled to begin in 2012 with the 2013 model year. In July 2011 an agreement was reached between Daimler AG and Robert Bosch GmbH to develop and produce innovative traction motors for electric vehicles. Based on this joint venture, Daimler planned to use the improved traction motors with the third generation of Smart electric drive cars scheduled to go on sale in 2012.

=== Specifications ===
- Power: 20 kW (27 hp) continuous; peak power output of 30 kW (40 hp) for approximately 2 minutes
- Torque: 120 newton-metres (89 lbf⋅ft)
- Battery capacity: 16.5 kWh lithium-ion battery
- Economy: 12 kWh/100 km, also reported to be 200 W·h/mi
- Range: 135 kilometres (84 miles) on the (NEDC cycle)
- Top speed: 100 kilometres per hour (62 miles per hour)

The lithium-ion battery pack took three hours to charge from 20 to 80 percent of its capacity with a standard 230 V outlet. It could also be charged using a common US household 120 V outlet connected to a recently adopted SAE J1772 port for US models. The car has a 3.3 kW on-board charger for AC charging. Smart claims a 0–60 km/h (0–37 mph) time of 6.5 seconds, the same as for the gasoline version. It has a single fixed-gear ratio transmission and is about 308 lb (140 kg) heavier than a gasoline-powered Fortwo.

=== Markets and sales ===
Over 2,300 units of the second generation models were leased between 2009 and October 2012 in 18 markets around the world. Of these, 1,721 units were registered in Europe through October 2012, and 527 units in the U.S. through December 2012.

==== United States ====
The trial program in the US began in January 2011 with the first customer delivery in Washington, D.C. A total of 250 units were made available for leasing at a price of US$599 per month for a period of 48 months and 60,000 kilometres (37,282 mi), plus $2,500 due at signing. This pricing is before taxes or any government tax credits or rebates available. The limited fleet of second-generation Smart Fortwo electric drive cars was introduced first in Portland, Oregon, Los Angeles, San Jose, California, Orlando, Florida, Austin, Detroit, Indianapolis and the Interstate 95 corridor between Washington, D.C., and Boston, including New Jersey and New York.

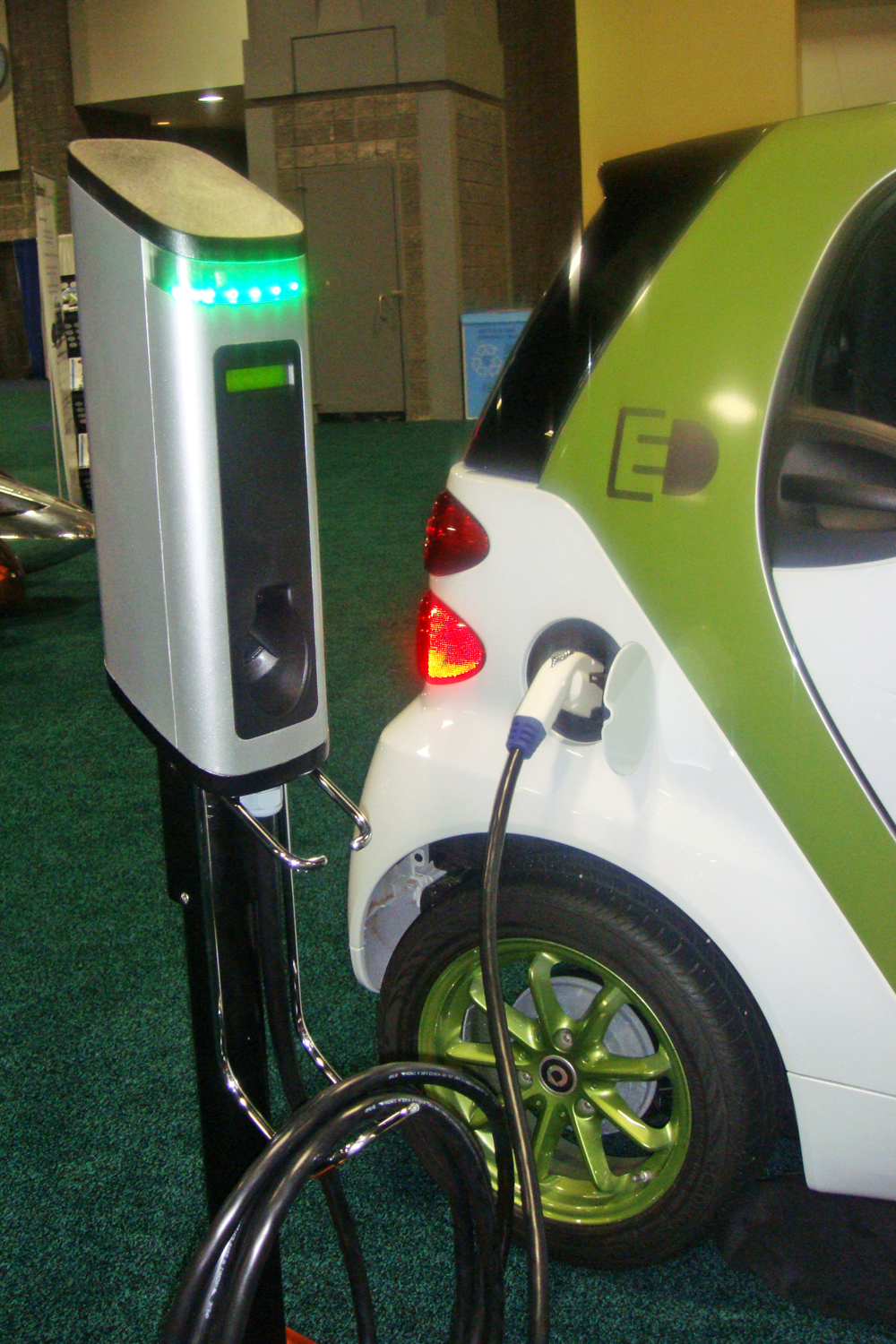
Smart ED recharging at a SemaConnect charging station

In July 2011, Car2Go announced the deployment of a fleet of Smart EDs into carsharing service in San Diego before the end of 2011. The company stated that the carsharing electric cars will have a range of 84 miles (135 km), and, based on their experience with usage in other cities, they will most likely need to be recharged every two or three days. When reserving the electric car online, San Diego Car2Go members are able to see the battery's state of charge, so if the customer wants to go for an extended drive, the option is available to find the right car for that trip.

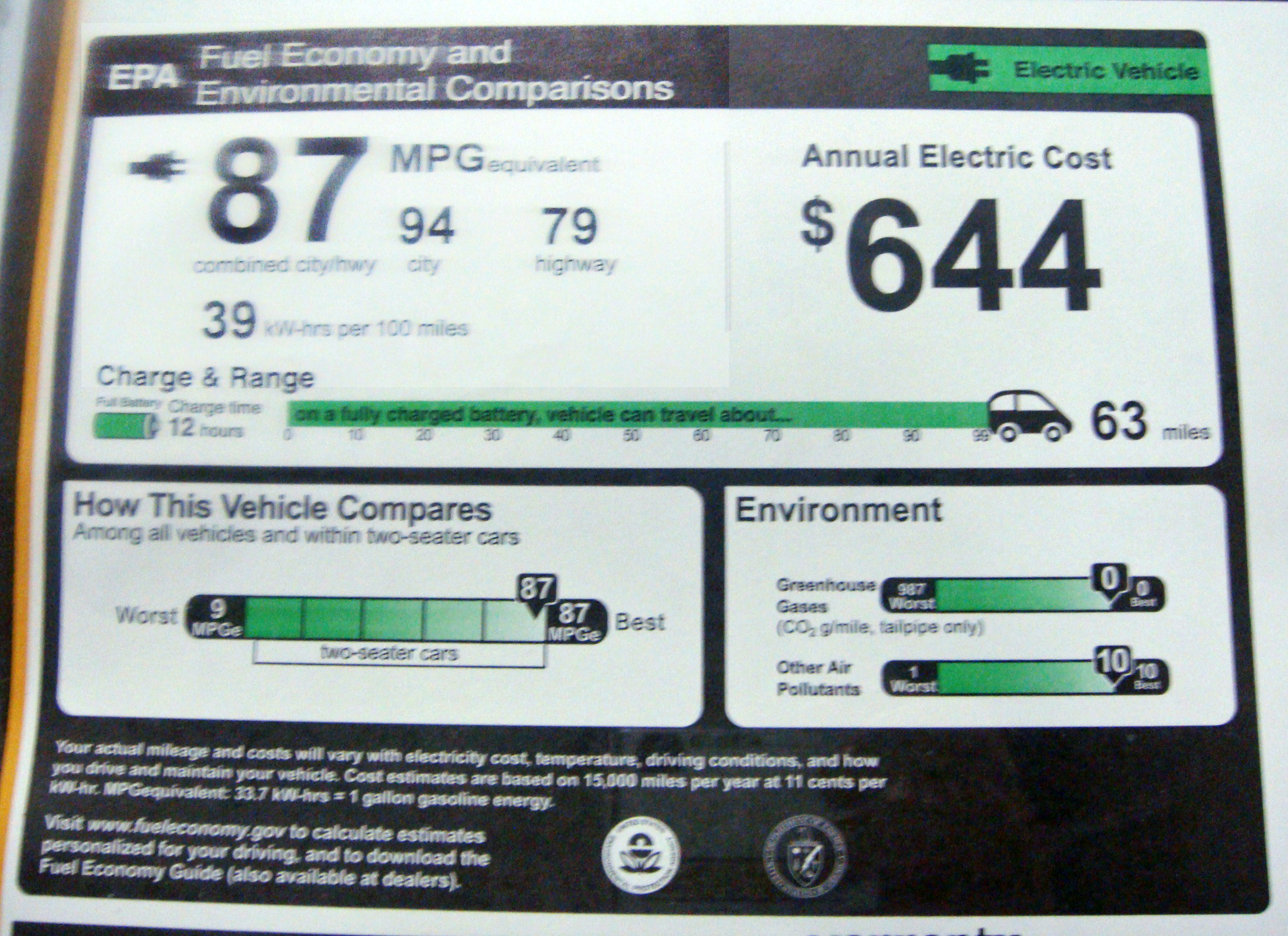
Monroney label showing United States Environmental Protection Agency's fuel economy and environmental comparison label for the 2011 Smart ED

In November 2011 fleets of 300 Smart EDs each were deployed in San Diego and Amsterdam as part of the Car2Go service. As of December 2012, a total of 527 Smart EDs were registered in the US since January 2011, including 300 units deployed for Car2Go in San Diego.

Considering an energy consumption of 39 kilowatt-hours per 100 miles (22 MJ/km) and a conversion factor of 33.7 kWh of electricity being the energy equivalent of a US gallon of gasoline (32 megajoules to the litre), the US Environmental Protection Agency officially rated the Smart ED combined fuel economy at 87 miles per gallon gasoline equivalent (mpg-e) (2.7 L gasoline equivalent/100 km; 104 mpg-imp gasoline equivalent), 94 mpg_{‑US} (2.5 L/100 km; 113 mpg_{‑imp}) city and 79 mpg_{‑US} (3.0 L/100 km; 95 mpg_{‑imp}) highway. EPA's official all-electric range is 63 miles (101 km), but in favorable conditions in an urban environment at warm temperatures the carmaker claims the Smart Fortwo ED can reach up to 98 miles (158 km). According to Forbes, the American Council for an Energy Efficient Economy ranked the Smart ForTwo Electric Drive the "greenest" car for 2014.

==== France ====
A total of 152 Smart EDs were registered in France since 2010 through December 2012.

=== Essential importance for Tesla Motors ===
Although Tesla Motors was not directly involved in the development of the final Smart ED3 purchase model, the Daimler partnership concerning the Smart ED2 was essential for Tesla. Elon Musk said at the 2016 Tesla shareholder meeting: "If we hadn’t done that [the Daimler cooperation], Tesla would have died because the Daimler partnership gave us credibility, that a major OEM was willing to work with us, and they also paid us for the [Smart ED2] development program which is really helpful from a revenue standpoint". "Without that investment, Tesla would have been game over".

== Third generation ==
Smart ForTwo Electric Drive (ED3)
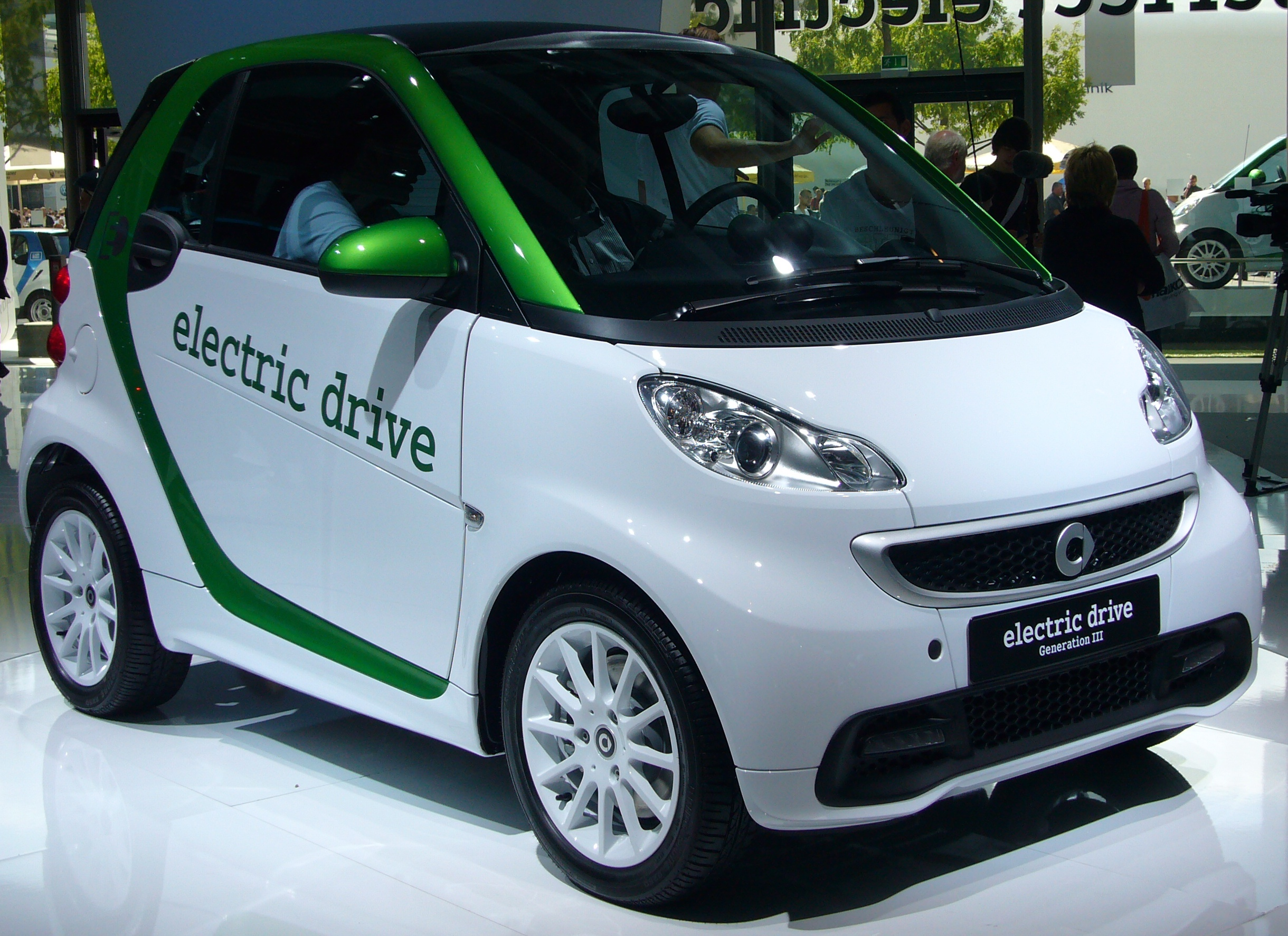
- Third generation, Smart ED3, unveiled at the 2011 Frankfurt Motor Show

Overview
- Manufacturer: Smart
- Model years: 2012-2016

Body and chassis
- Body style: 3-door hatchback
- Layout: Rear-motor, rear-wheel-drive
- Related: Smart ForTwo (2nd Generation)

Powertrain
- Electric motor: 55 hp (41 kW) 96 ft⋅lb (130 N⋅m) Bosch SMG 180/120 AC synchronous permanent-magnet motor
- Battery: 17.6 kWh lithium-ion battery by Deutsche ACCUmotive
- Plug-in charging: SAE J1772; Type II

The third-generation Smart electric drive, Smart ED3, was unveiled at the September 2011 Frankfurt Motor Show. Key differences with the second-generation model include a more powerful electric motor with improved acceleration and top speed; a new lithium-ion battery pack, which increased the range to 140 kilometres (87 mi) with a quick-charge option; other new features include an enlarged grille opening, LED daytime running lights, wider door sills, some minor modifications to the rear, fully automatic air conditioning with pollen filter and pre-air conditioning. Several features are controlled remotely through a smart drive application for the iPhone. This is the first generation to be sold to the public, with the previous generations being leased and subsequently crushed afterwards. The battery was not included in the price and was instead rented to customers and could be replaced at any time.

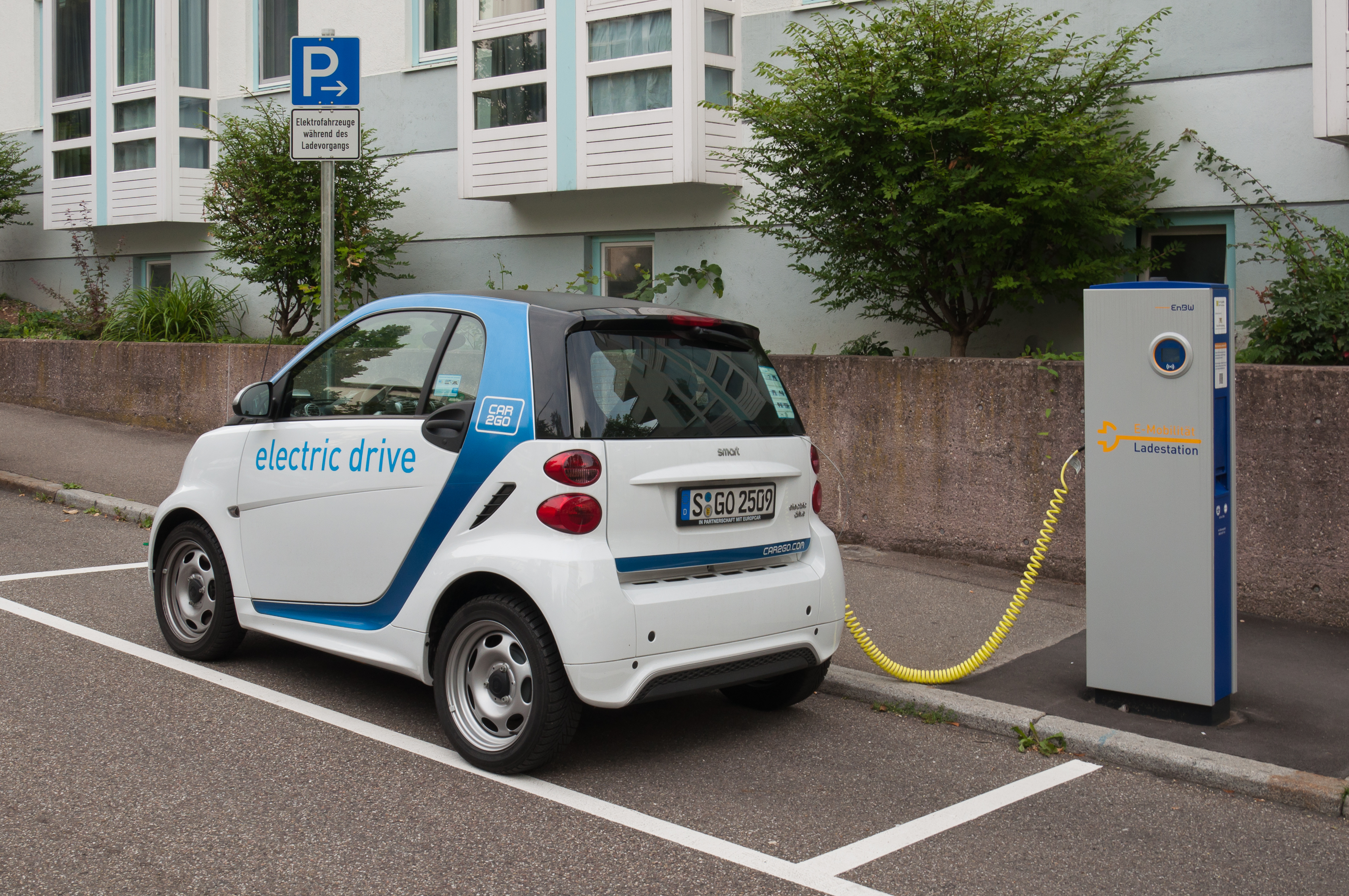
Third generation, Smart ED3 at a Car2Go charging station in Stuttgart

In Germany the Smart ED was available for €16,000 (around US$22,400) plus a monthly fee of €60 (US$84) for the battery rental. Online reservations were scheduled to begin in the fourth quarter 2011. In the US pricing started at US$25,750 and US$28,750 for the Soft Top Cabriolet before any applicable government incentives. Canadian pricing for the Electric Drive starts at CA$26,990 and the cabriolet version started at CA$29,990.

The third-generation Smart electric drive was released in the US in May 2013 with 60 units delivered that month. Sales in Europe also began in May 2013. Smart planned to mass-produce the electric car with availability in 30 markets worldwide.

In February 2014, Smart announced it would be offering the 2014 model year nationwide; the 2013 model was only available in CARB states.

=== Markets and sales ===
Global sales of the third generation model reached 4,130 units during 2013. The Smart ED 3 was the top selling plug-in electric car in Germany in 2013, with 2,146 units registered through December 2013, representing 32% of the 6,711 Smarts sold in the country. After the German market, European sales were led by France, with 478 units registered through December 2013. U.S. sales totaled 923 units through December 2013.

Global cumulative sales of the third generation variant reached 6,514 units up to June 2014, while combined sales of second and third generation reached 8,814 units as of June 2014. As of June 2014, combined sales of both generations reached 3,959 units in Germany, 2,542 units in the U.S. and 865 units in France.

=== Smart ForJeremy variation ===
The Smart ForJeremy is a version of Smart ForTwo electric drive designed by Jeremy Scott. It included bright white body colour, chrome-plated tridion cell, a wing made of transparent fibreglass and decorated with rocket-shaped elements that light up red, wider rear tyres and wider rear wheel arches, wheel rims are shaped like aeroplane propellers, bright chromium-plated "eyebrows" above its front headlights, chromium-plated top half of the mirror caps and the frame around the radiator grille, fine white nappa leather upholstery at instrument panel, seats and door trim; diamond stitching at seat insert areas and the centre panels in the doors, bright chromium-plated side air inlets.

The vehicle was unveiled on the eve of the LA Auto Show at Jim Henson Studios in Los Angeles, with music provided by the artist M.I.A.

Production version was planned in 2013 in limited quantities.

=== Brabus Smart ED ===
The Brabus Smart ED is a version of the Smart ForTwo electric drive designed by Brabus to be a performance oriented version of the electric Smart. It featured Brabus Monoblock wheels, custom aero kit, leather seats, stainless pedals and a Brabus steering wheel. It has the same electric motor as the standard Smart ED3, but was tuned to 60kW as opposed to the standard 55kW.

=== Specifications ===
- Power: peak power output of 55 kW (74 hp), Permanent Magnet AC Synchronous motor (PMSM)
- Torque: 130 newton-metres (96 lbf⋅ft)
- Top speed of 125 km/h (78 mph)
- 0 to 100 km/h (0 to 60 mph) in 11.5 seconds and 0 to 60 km/h (0 to 37 mph) in 5 seconds
- Battery capacity: 17.6 kWh lithium-ion battery by Deutsche ACCUmotive
- Range: 145 km (90 mi)
- Miles per gallon equivalent: 122 MPGe city, 93 MPGe highway, 107 MPGe combined
- Artificial warning sounds for pedestrians automatically activated in the U.S. and Japan, and manually activated in Europe.

The electric motor was developed between Daimler AG and Robert Bosch GmbH to form EM-motive, which later merged back into Bosch GmbH after the 4th generation smart was discontinued. The motor, named the SMG 180, was found in a variety of cars such as the Fiat 500e, Peugeot 3008 hybrid, and the Porsche 918 Spyder (front motor). The motor is a Permanent Magnet AC Synchronous motor that is derated from the stated 80kW to 55kW peak in the standard version and 60kW peak in the Brabus version due to the batteries being unable to discharge that much power.

== Fourth generation ==
Smart EQ ForTwo
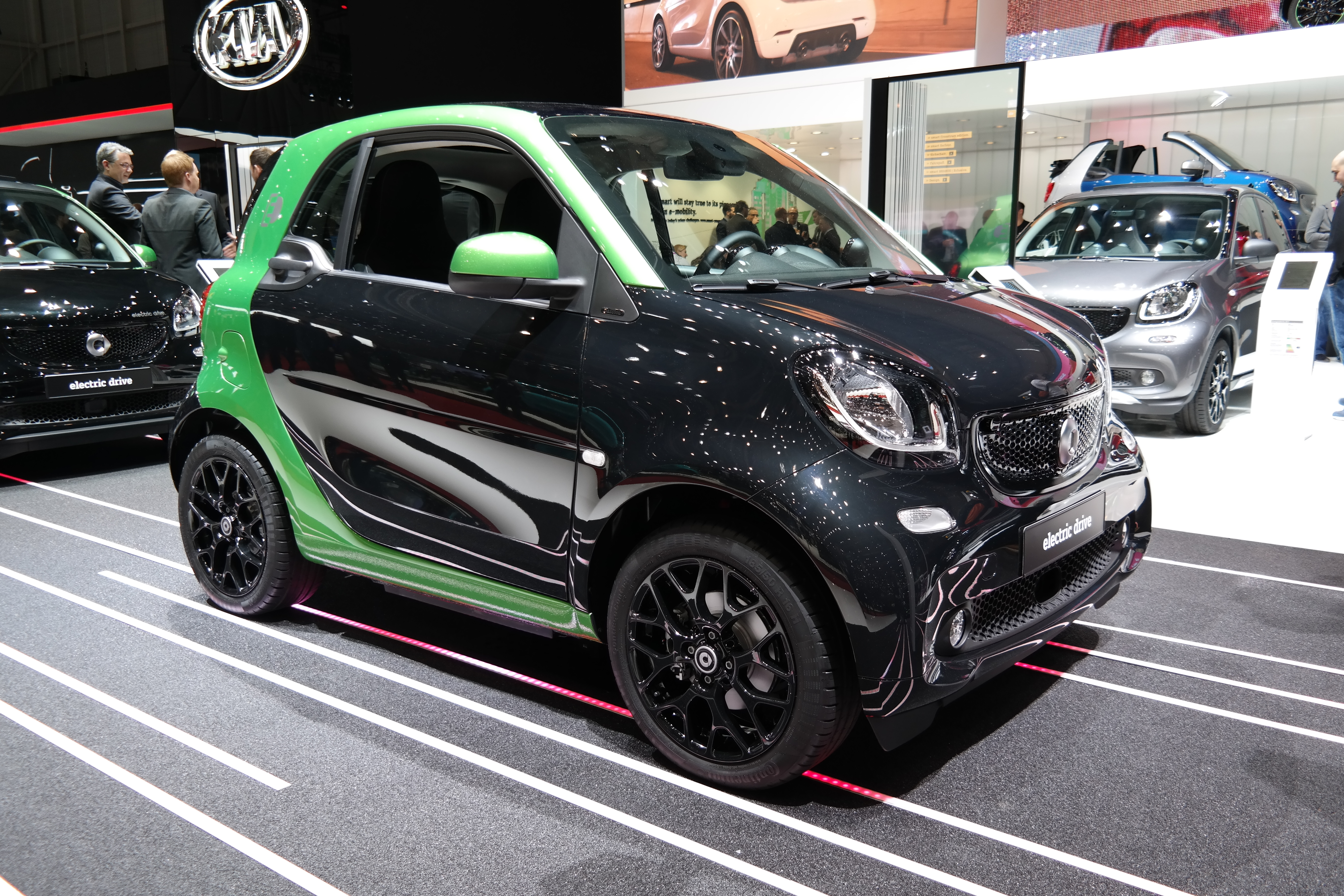
- Smart EQ Fortwo (then known as Smart Fortwo ED) at Geneva Motor Show 2017

Overview
- Manufacturer: Smart
- Model years: 2017-2024

Body and chassis
- Body style: 3-door hatchback
- Layout: Rear-motor, rear-wheel-drive
- Related: Smart ForTwo (3rd Generation)

Powertrain
- Electric motor: 80 hp (60 kW) 118 ft⋅lb (160 N⋅m) Renault Cléon AC synchronous permanent-magnet motor
- Battery: 17.6 kWh lithium-ion battery by Deutsche ACCUmotive
- Plug-in charging: SAE J1772; Type II

Chronology
- Successor: Smart 1

The fourth-generation model, based on the C453, was made available for sale in the US on 9 August 2017, as a 2017 model; European sales started earlier the same year. The gasoline model was no longer for sale in Canada and the US after the 2017 model year. With the new body and the Renault/Mercedes Edison Platform, it is available with an upgraded 80 hp (60 kW), 118 ft⋅lb (160 N⋅m) electric motor and a 17.6 kWh battery that stays with the car instead of being rented. It has an EPA Certified range of 58 miles (93 km). The charge rate is 7.2 kW. Also available as a cabriolet, it is the only current production electric convertible in the world.

The model was later renamed as Smart EQ Fortwo in 2018 as Daimler started to use EQ brand for electric car lineup.

A facelifted model was unveiled in 2019, for the 2020 model year. This happened just before Geely bought a 50% stake in Smart and the model lasted until Geely made their own models and discontinued the Smart EQ in 2024.

=== Specifications ===
- Power: peak power output of 60 kW (80 hp), Permanent Magnet AC Synchronous motor (PMSM)
- Torque: 160 newton-metres (118 lbf⋅ft)
- Top speed of 128 km/h (80 mph)
- 0 to 100 km/h (0 to 60 mph) in 11.4 seconds
- Battery capacity: 17.6 kWh lithium-ion battery by Deutsche ACCUmotive
- Range: 145 km (90 mi)

With the new generation Smart being on a shared platform with Renault, the motor used was a higher powered unit made by Renault in their Cléon plant in France. The batteries are an LG chemistry composing of 96 cells assembled in Saxony by Deutsche Accumotive, a Daimler Subsidiary. The new battery shared the same capacity as the last generation, but with a higher efficiency of 15.1 kW-hr per 62 miles to 12.9 kW-hr per 62 miles and 17.2 kW-hr of the total charge can be used to power the vehicle. This new battery is no longer rented but is warrantied to 8 years, 60,000 miles.

=== Smart EQ Forfour ===
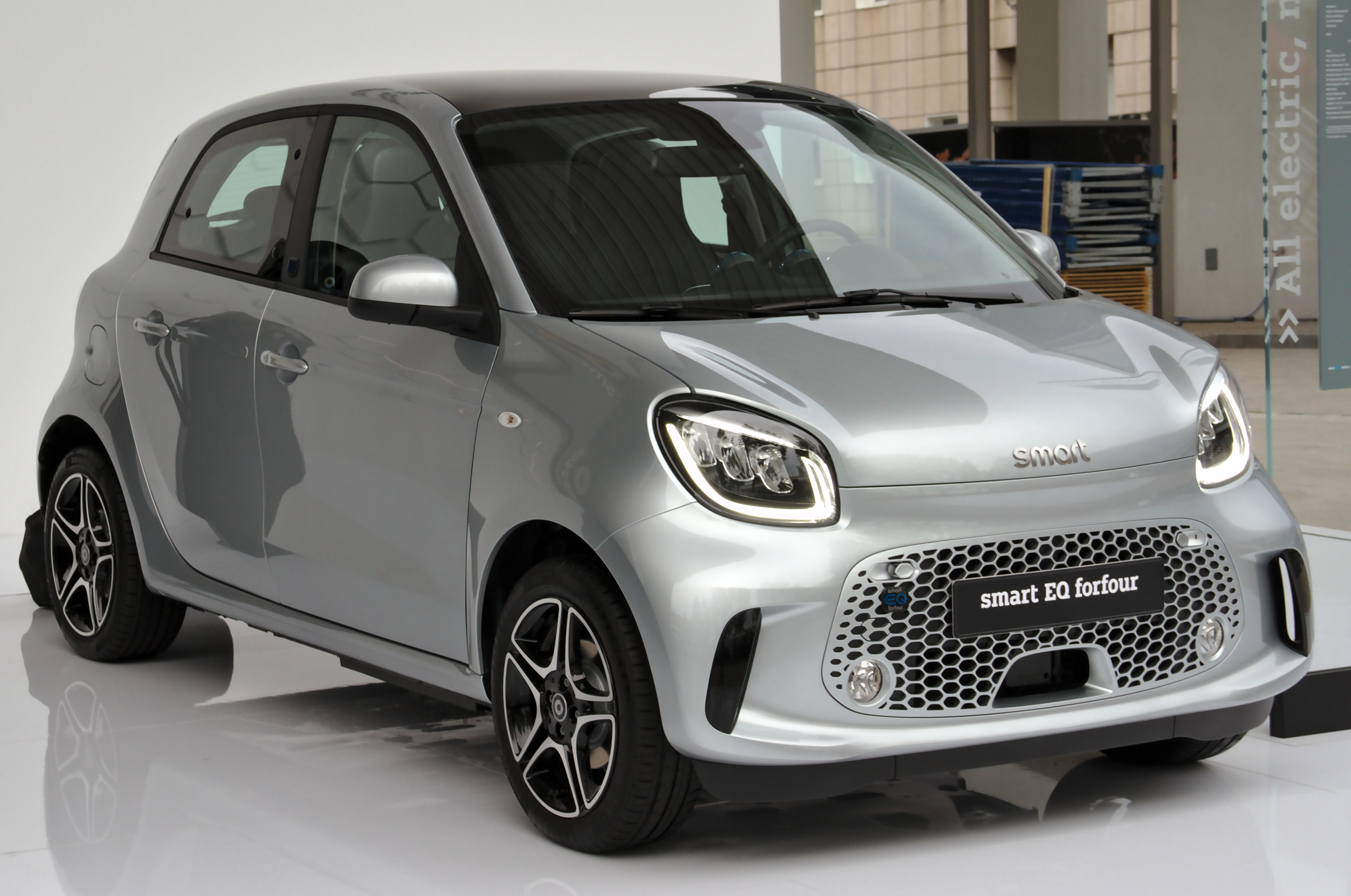
Smart EQ Forfour, post-facelift

Starting from this generation, the electric Smart is also available as a 5-door hatchback. The Smart EQ Forfour is a battery electric variant of the Smart Forfour, and shares the same 80 hp (60 kW) motor as the ForTwo. Just like its ICE counterpart, it shares its platform with the Renault Twingo and is manufactured in Novo Mesto, Slovenia. The battery capacity is 17.6 kWh, out of which 16.7 kWh is usable. Its electricity consumption is 13.1 kWh/100 km, therefore equating to a range of 127.48 km.

== Fifth generation ==
Smart #2 (Smart hashtag 2)

More or less the fifth generation of an electric Smart ForTwo is the Smart #2 (Smart hashtag 2) that was unveiled it October 2026. While the overall layout nearly is the same, it is made by Geely in China, has twice the battery capacity at 35.8 kWh, and offers DC fast charging in under 20 minutes.

== Gallery ==
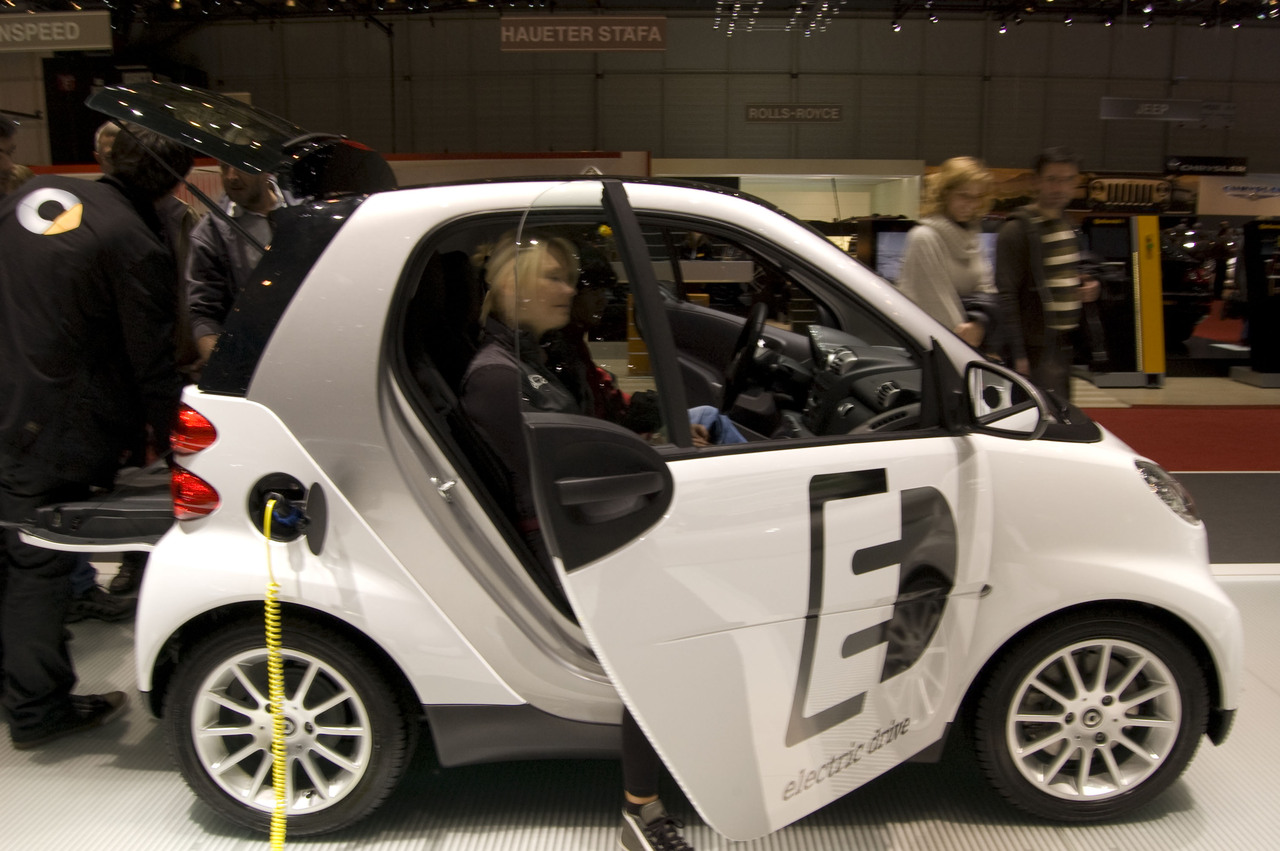
Smart Electric Drive at the Geneva Motor Show, 2009

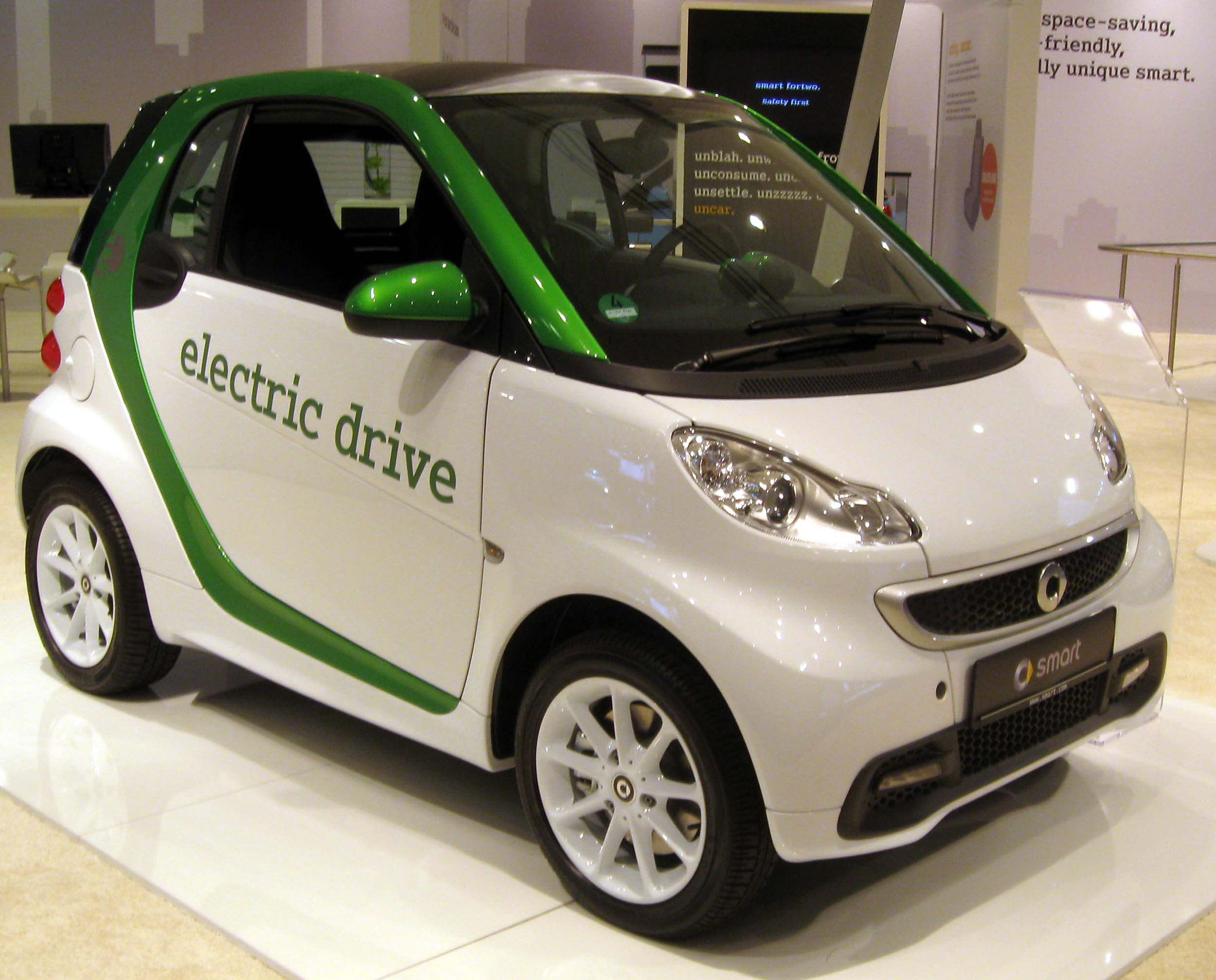
2013 Smart Fortwo electric drive

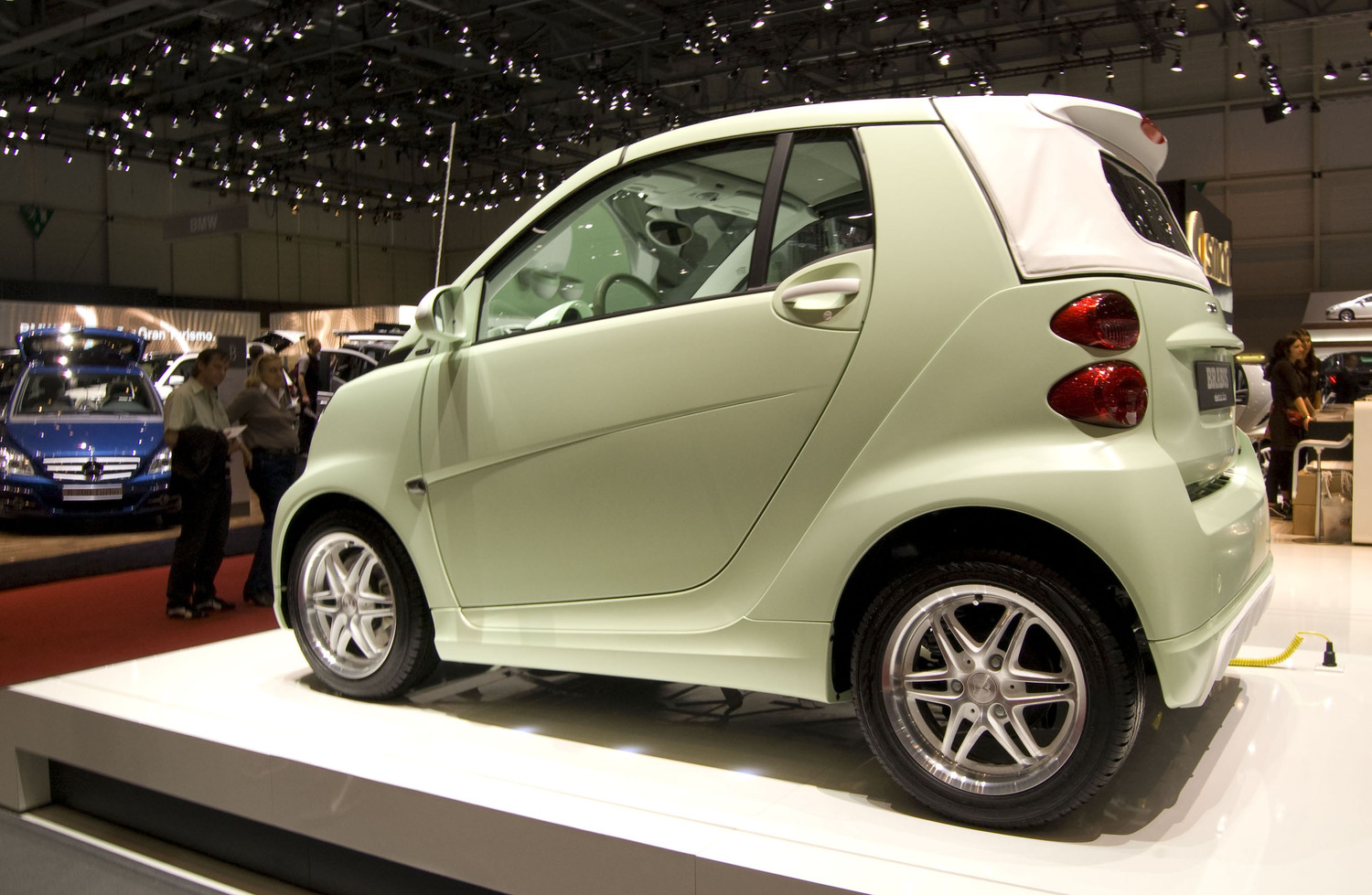
Brabus-tuned Smart Fortwo ED concept at the Geneva Motor Show

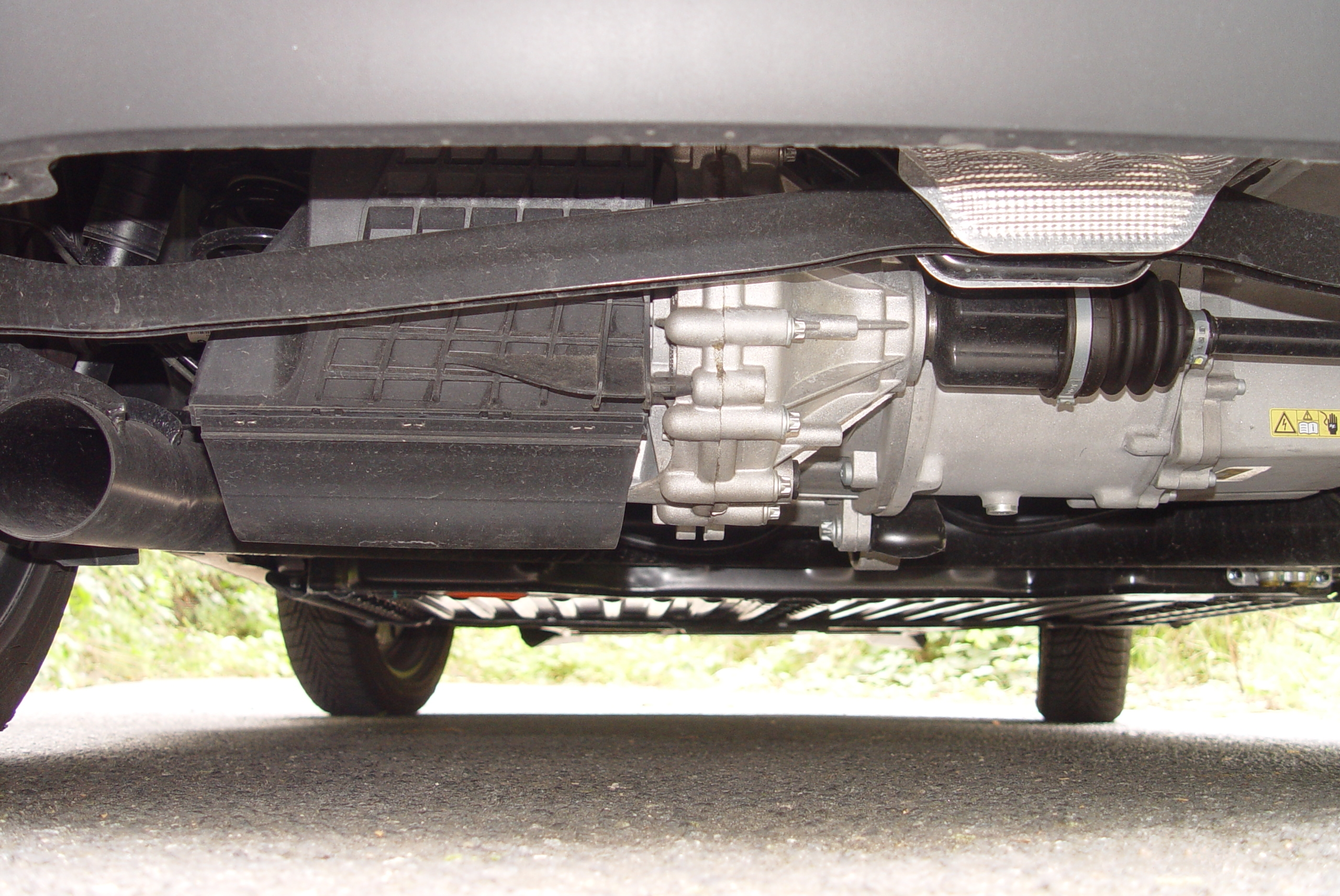
Electric Drive

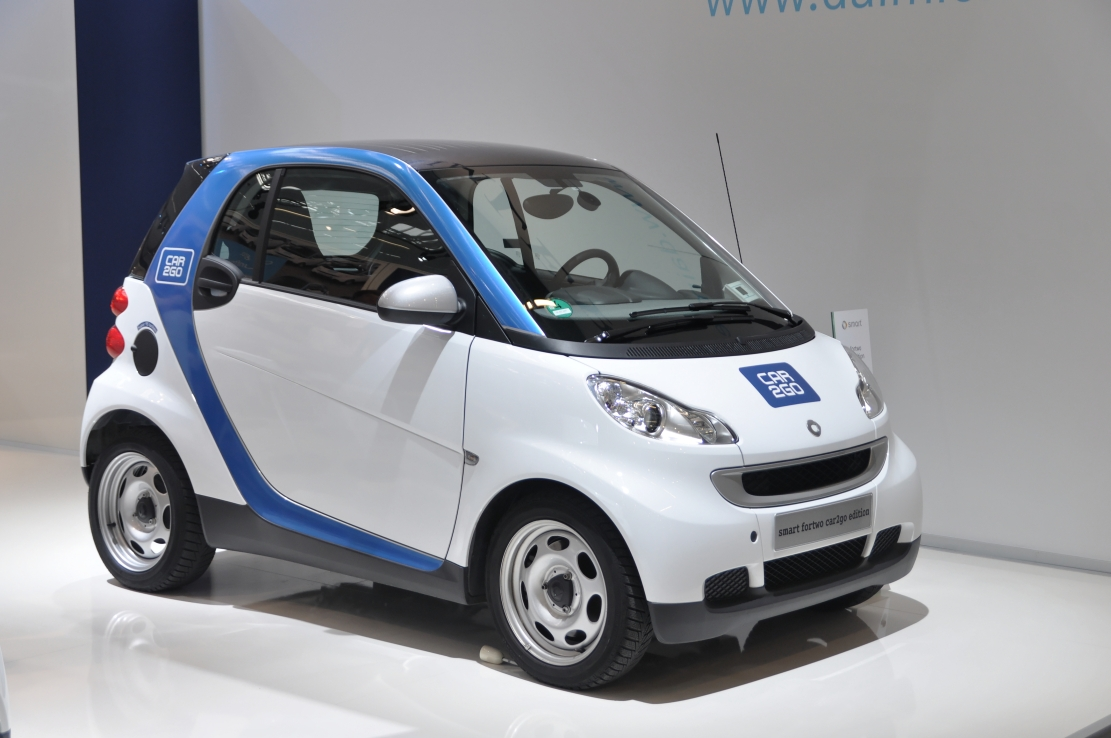
Smart Fortwo electric drive Car2Go edition

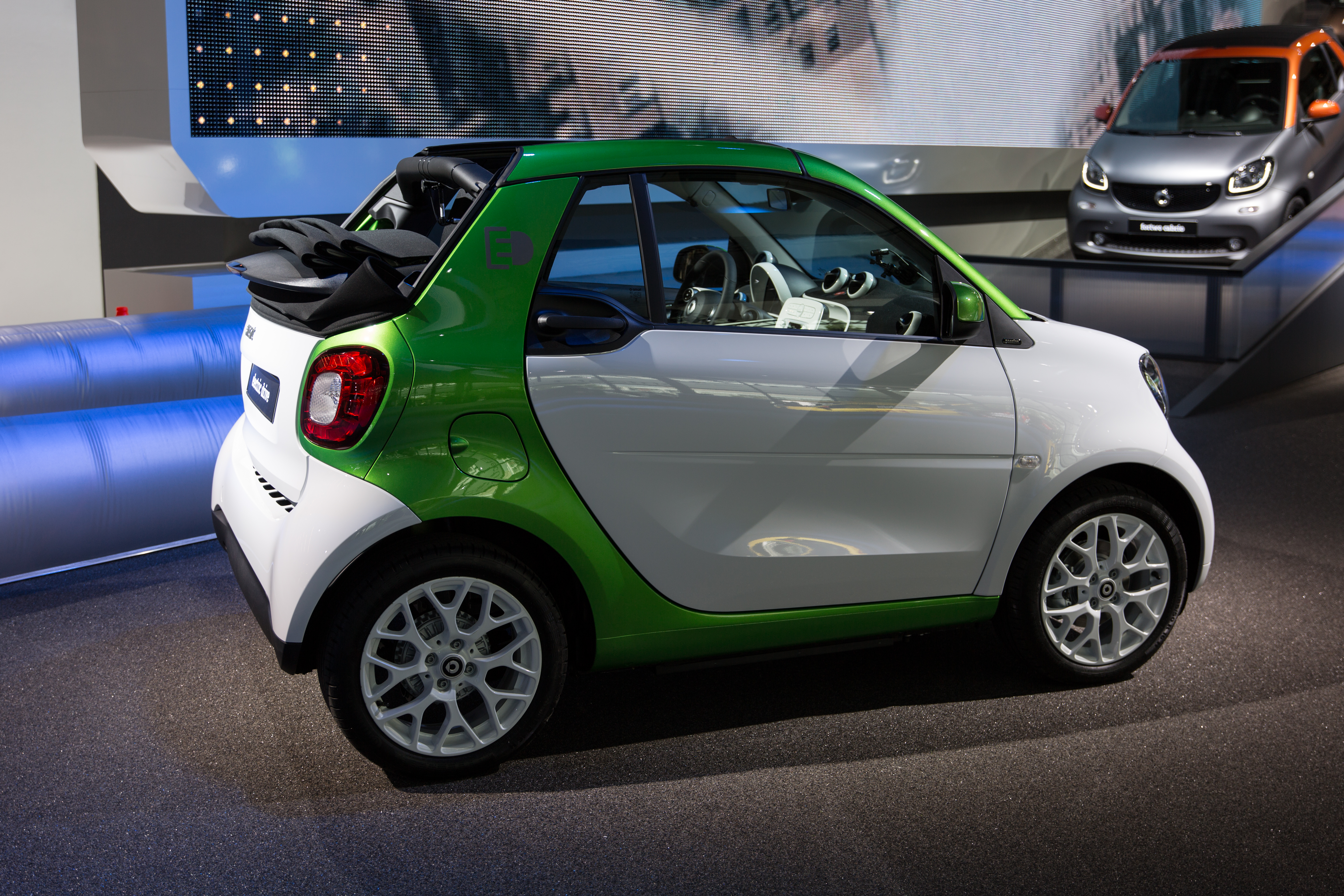
fortwo Electric Drive Cabrio at IAA 2017

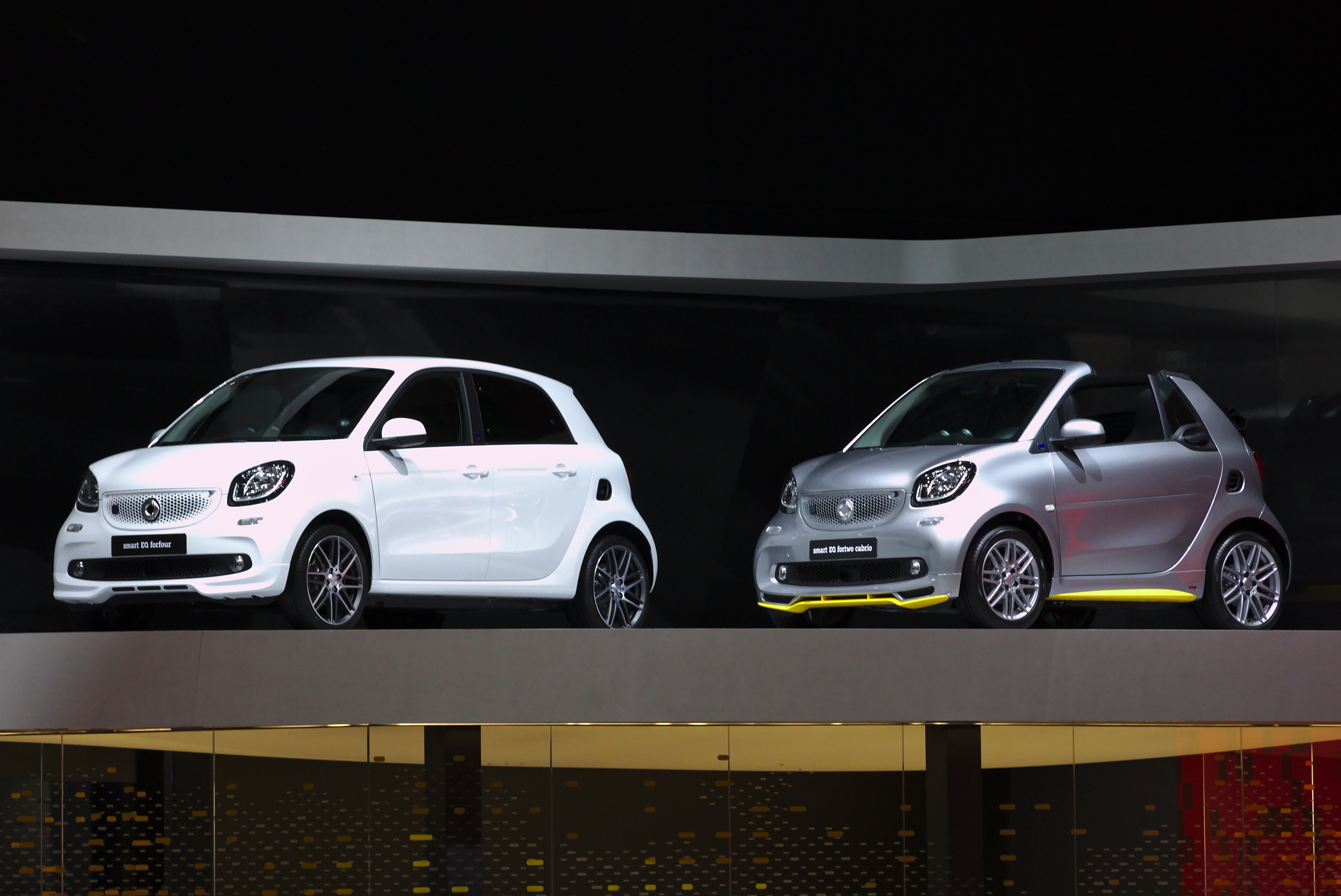
EQ Forfour (left) and EQ Fortwo convertible (right) in Geneva, 2019

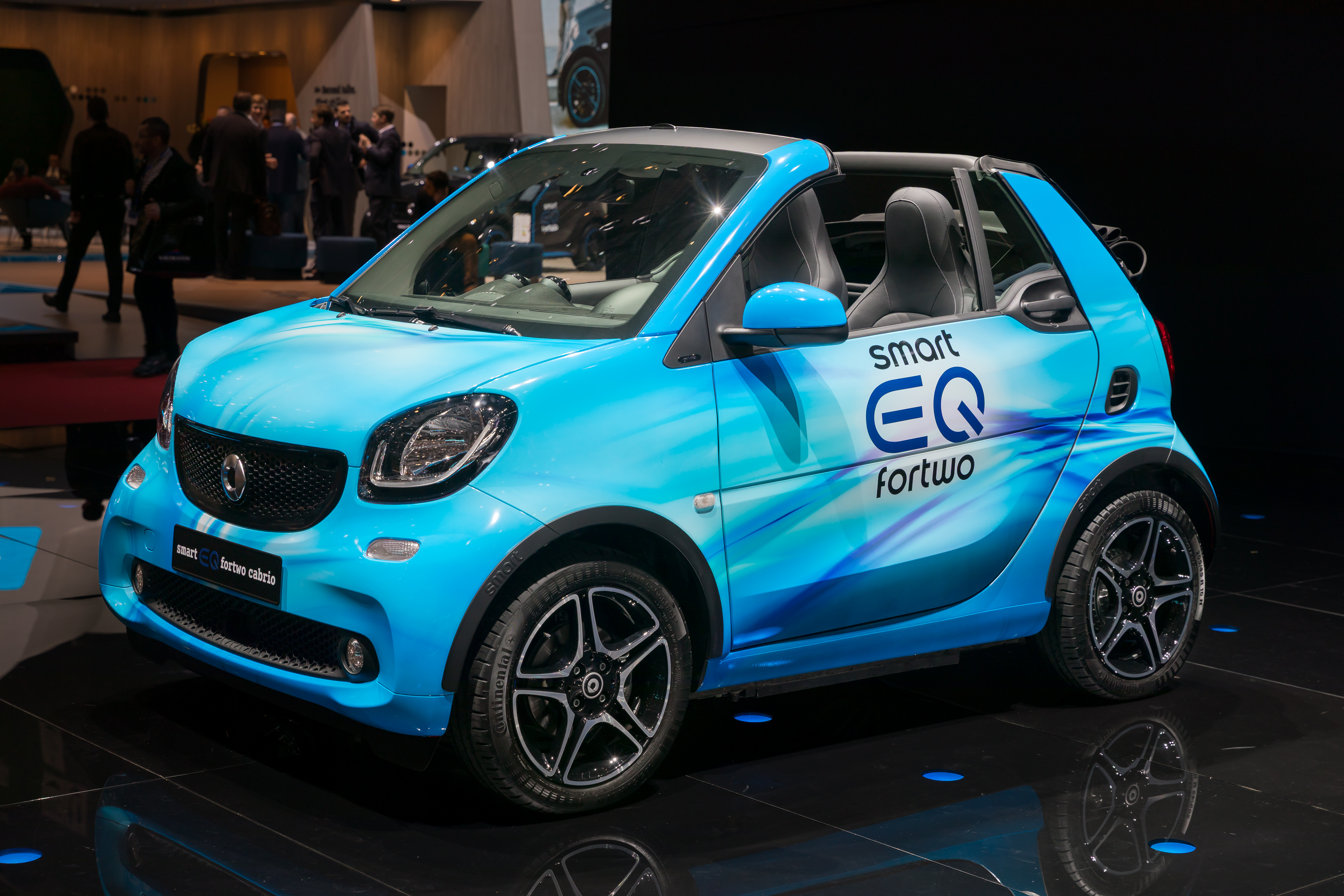
Smart EQ ForTwo Cabrio, GIMS 2018

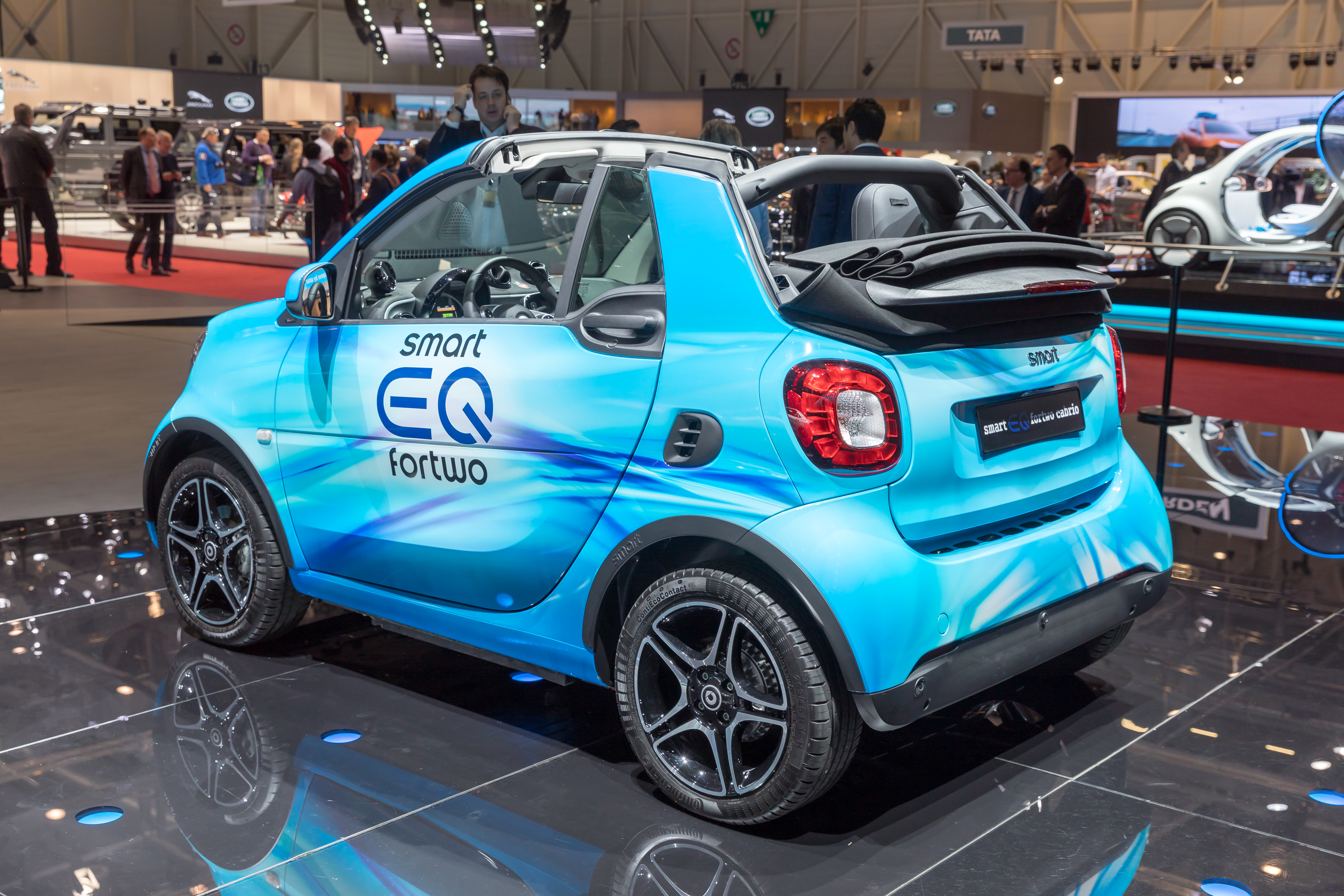
Smart EQ ForTwo Cabrio, GIMS 2018

== See also ==
- Electric car
- Government incentives for plug-in electric vehicles
- List of electric cars currently available
- List of modern production plug-in electric vehicles
- Mini E
- Plug-in electric vehicle
- Smart Fortwo
- Smart (marque)
- Zero-emissions vehicle
