= Smart 2 =

Battery electric city car

Smart #2
- Smart ♯2 Premium

Overview
- Manufacturer: Smart Automobile
- Production: 2026 (to commence)
- Assembly: China: Xi'an, Shaanxi
- Designer: Kai Sieber

Body and chassis
- Class: City car (A)
- Body style: 3-door hatchback
- Layout: Rear-motor, rear-wheel-drive
- Platform: Electric Compact Architecture (ECA)

Powertrain
- Electric motor: 60 kW TZ160XS00A PMSM
- Battery: 35.8-kW LFP CATL
- Electric range: 290 km (180 mi) (WLTP); 410 km (255 mi) (CLTC)
- Plug-in charging: DC: 65 kW

Dimensions
- Wheelbase: 1,875 mm (73.8 in)
- Length: 2,751–2,764 mm (108.3–108.8 in)
- Width: 1,669 mm (65.7 in)
- Height: 1,555 mm (61.2 in)
- Curb weight: 1,130 kg (2,491 lb)

Chronology
- Predecessor: Smart Fortwo (C453); Smart EQ Fortwo

The Smart #2 (Smart hashtag 2) is an upcoming battery electric city car produced by Smart Automobile, a joint venture between the Mercedes-Benz Group and Geely Holding. It is the China-made two-door, two-seat successor to the Smart Fortwo Electric Drive (ED3, 2012-2015) and the Smart EQ Fortwo (ED4, 2016-2024) that had been built at the Smartville, Hambach, France factory.

The production version of the Smart #2 made its official debut at the Paris Motor Show on 12 October 2026, ahead of its market launch in Europe and the United Kingdom.

== History ==
The #2 was previewed by the Smart Concept #2 unveiled at the April 2026 Beijing Auto Show. It was designed by Mercedes-Benz and adopts the traditional smart car short two-door body style with almost no front overhang, and wheels positioned at the corners of the body. Design features of the concept include LED lighting elements incorporating "#2" graphics, concealed door handles, a closed front grille, and a floating roof design.

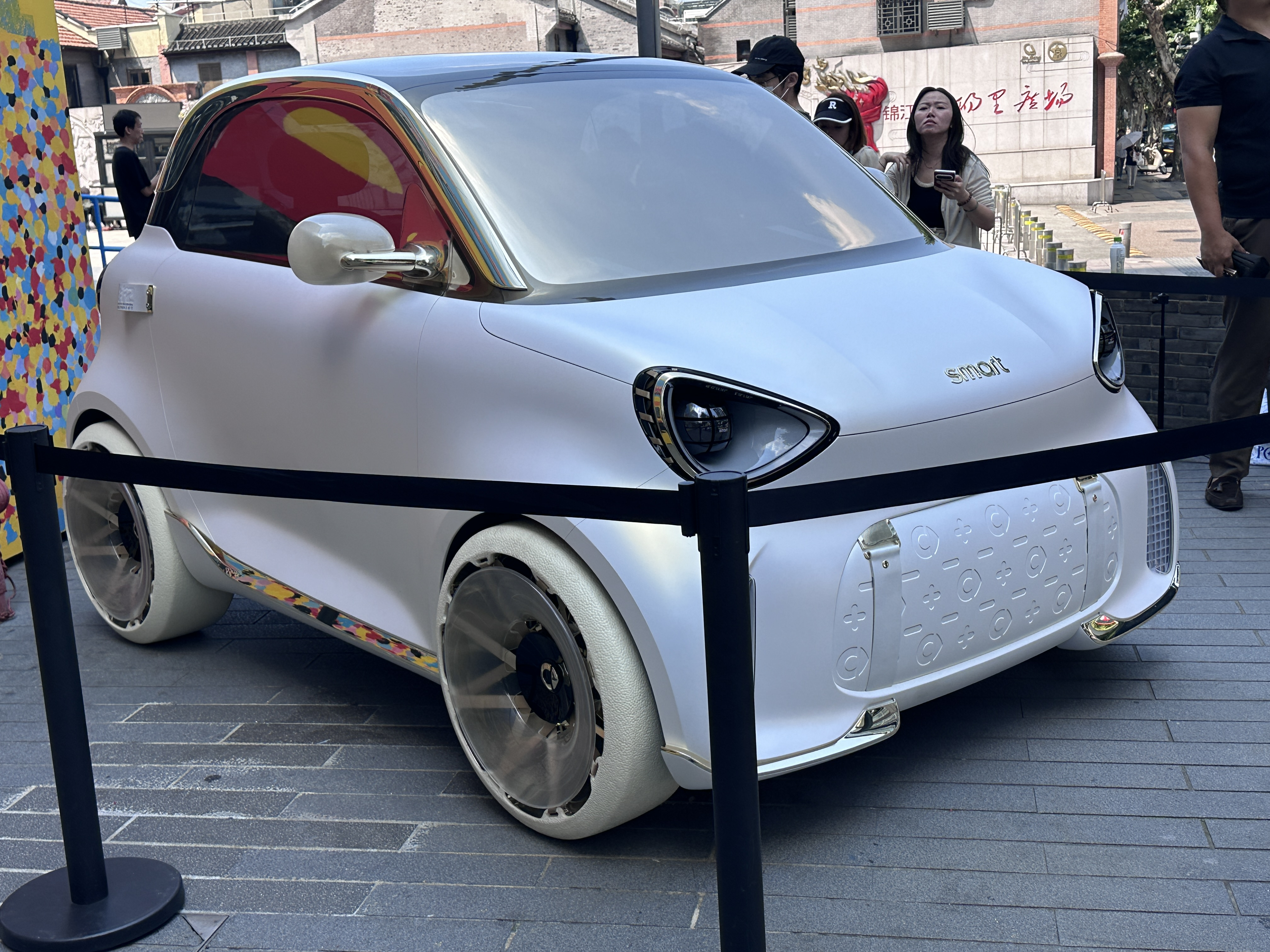
Smart Concept #2

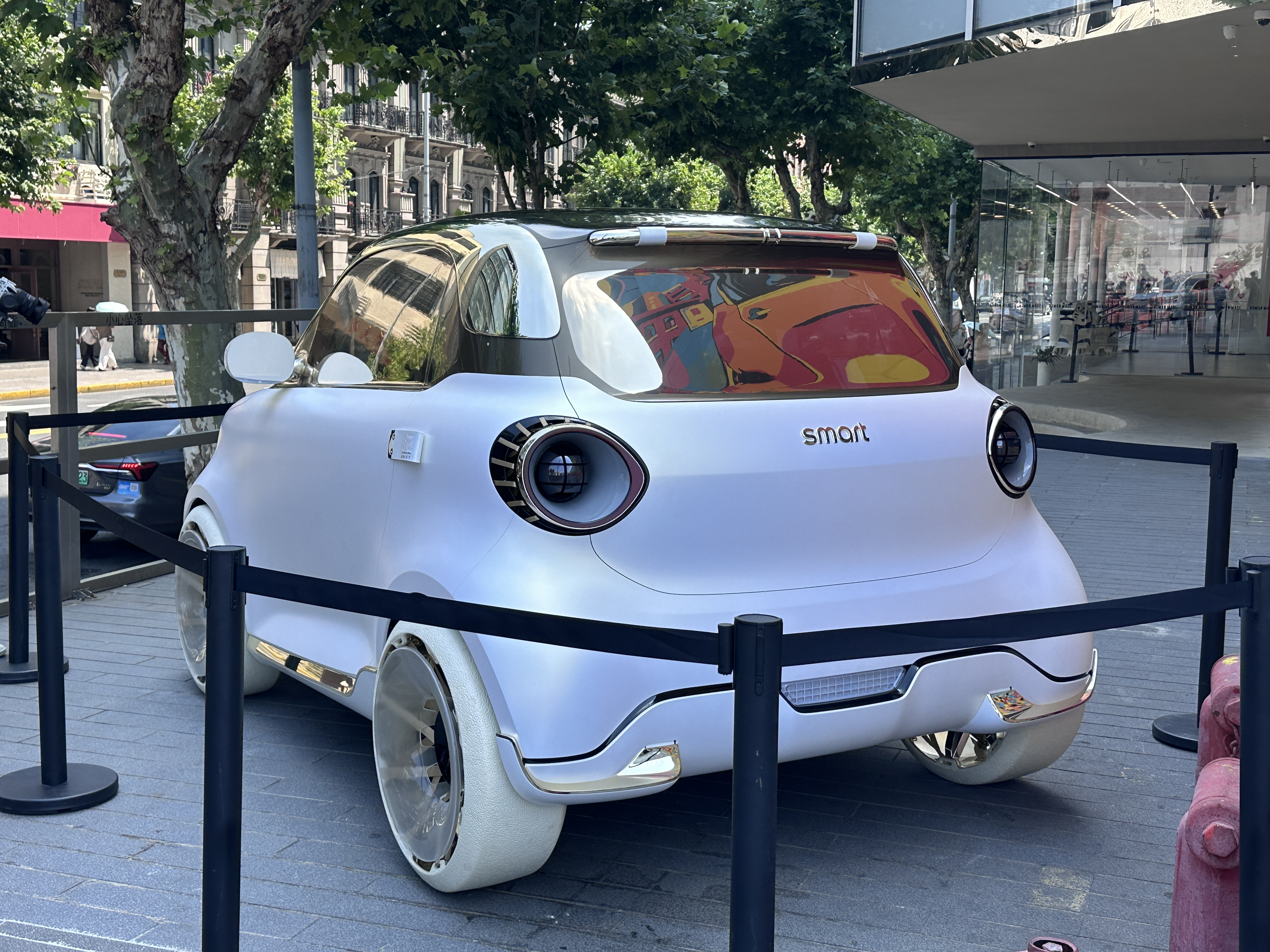
Rear view

== Overview ==
The #2 is very similarly sized to its predecessor with slight increases in its overall dimensions.

Compared to the Concept #2, the production #2 retains the concept's overall shape and design but with some subtler elements, such as traditional door handles and the lack of lower LED displays in the front. The "Tridion Safety Cell Evo" returns as an updated version of the design and structural feature of previous #2 models', only that it is now purely a structural feature and is not indicated by the design. Furthermore, the #2 also features a split tailgate, whose lower segment can support up to 120 kg (260 lb) and act as a seat featuring cupholder indents. It has a trunk with a 305 L (10.8 cu ft) capacity.

The interior uses an "S-shaped" dashboard design, allowing optimal space for the driver and passenger. features an 8.8-inch pill-shaped instrument panel and a 10.1-inch central infotainment display; Chinese market models are equipped with a larger 12.8-inch infotainment display which supports Apple Carplay, Huawei HiCar, ICCOA Carlink, and Flyme Link. A "Smart Pillar" is included, which can hold various accessories.

The #2 uses a MacPherson strut front and five-link rear suspension setup and has a turning radius of 3.35 m (11.0 ft). It uses 16-inch wheels with section widths of 185 mm front and 205 mm rear.

A limited-production "Couture Edition" of the #2 is launched alongside regular trim levels. It features an exclusive Atelier White Matte exterior paint, Platinum Gold accents along the mirror caps, roof, wheels and bottom edge of the vehicle, while a special panel with embossed Smart logos replace the standard grille-like panel. It is limited to 999 units in Europe and China each.

=== Powertrain and chassis ===
The #2 is based on the 400-volt Electric Compact Architecture (ECA) platform specifically developed for it. Smart says the Tridion Cell Evo safety cage can withstand up to 4,000 kg (8,800 lb) from above, and 78% of the chassis consists of high-strength steel, including 1,800 MPa door side-impact reinforcements, resulting in a torsional rigidity of 39,000 N·m/°.

It uses a CATL-produced 35.8 kWh lithium iron phosphate (LFP) battery, marking an approximate twofold increase in capacity compared to its predecessors, providing a WLTP driving range of 290 km (180 mi) at 13.6 kWh/100 km (219 Wh/mi). All models in the #2 range use a rear-wheel-drive layout and a single motor that produces a peak power of 80 hp (60 kW; 81 PS) and 130 N⋅m (96 lb⋅ft) of torque. It supports vehicle-to-load (V2L) functionalities and CCS charging, charging from 10 to 80 percent in under 20 minutes using a DC fast charger at 65 kW.

It has a top speed of 140 km/h (87 mph) and a claimed 0– acceleration time of 3.8 seconds.

Side view

Rear view

Interior
