= Fisker Ronin =

Electric sports car

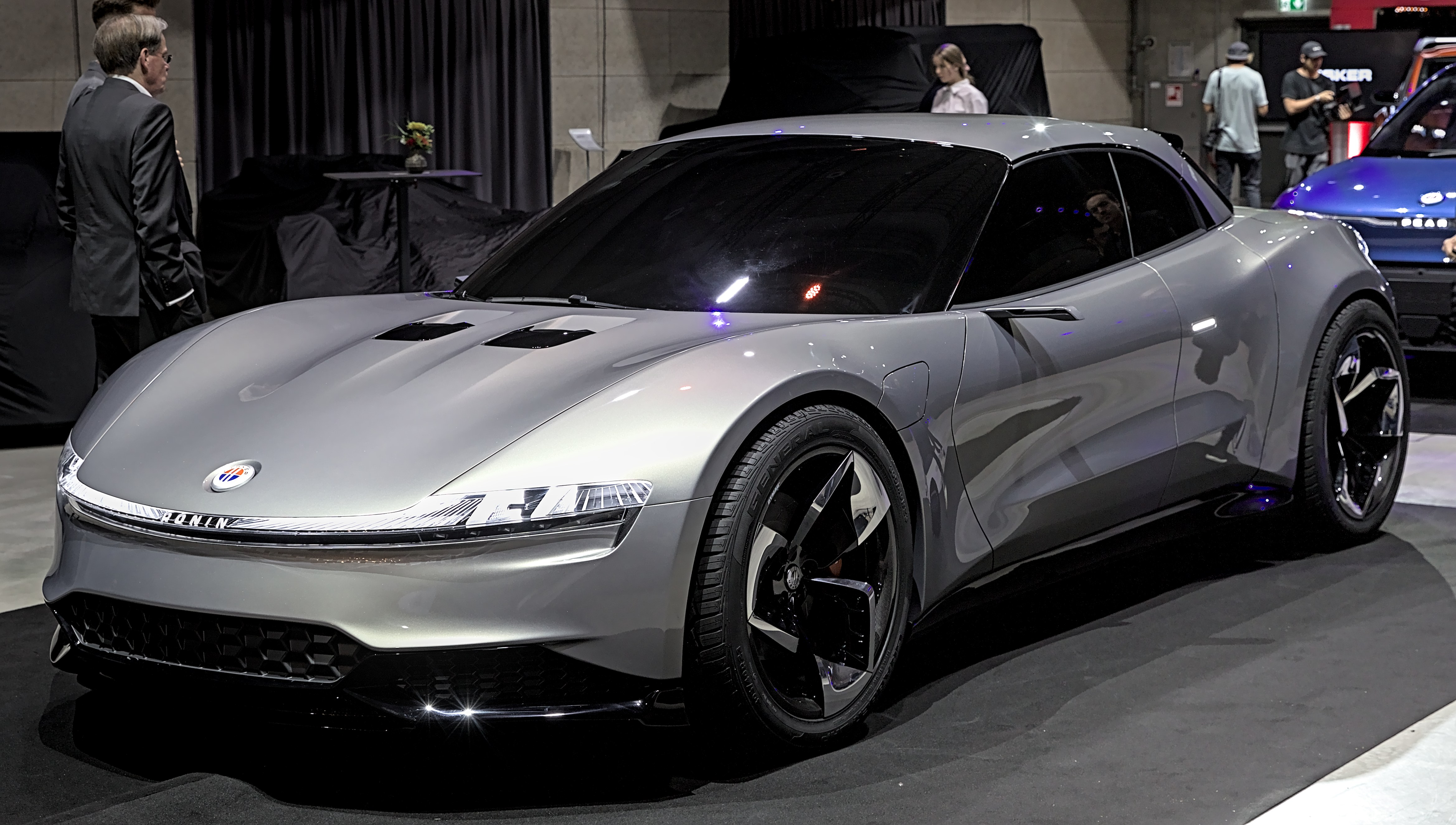

Overview
- Manufacturer: Fisker Inc.
- Production: Cancelled (as of October 2024)

Body and chassis
- Class: Sports car (S)
- Body style: 2-door coupé-cabriolet

The Fisker Ronin is a battery electric sports car produced by American electric vehicle company Fisker Inc. It was set to be released in 2025, but since that announcement the company filed for bankruptcy protection in June of 2024.

== Overview ==
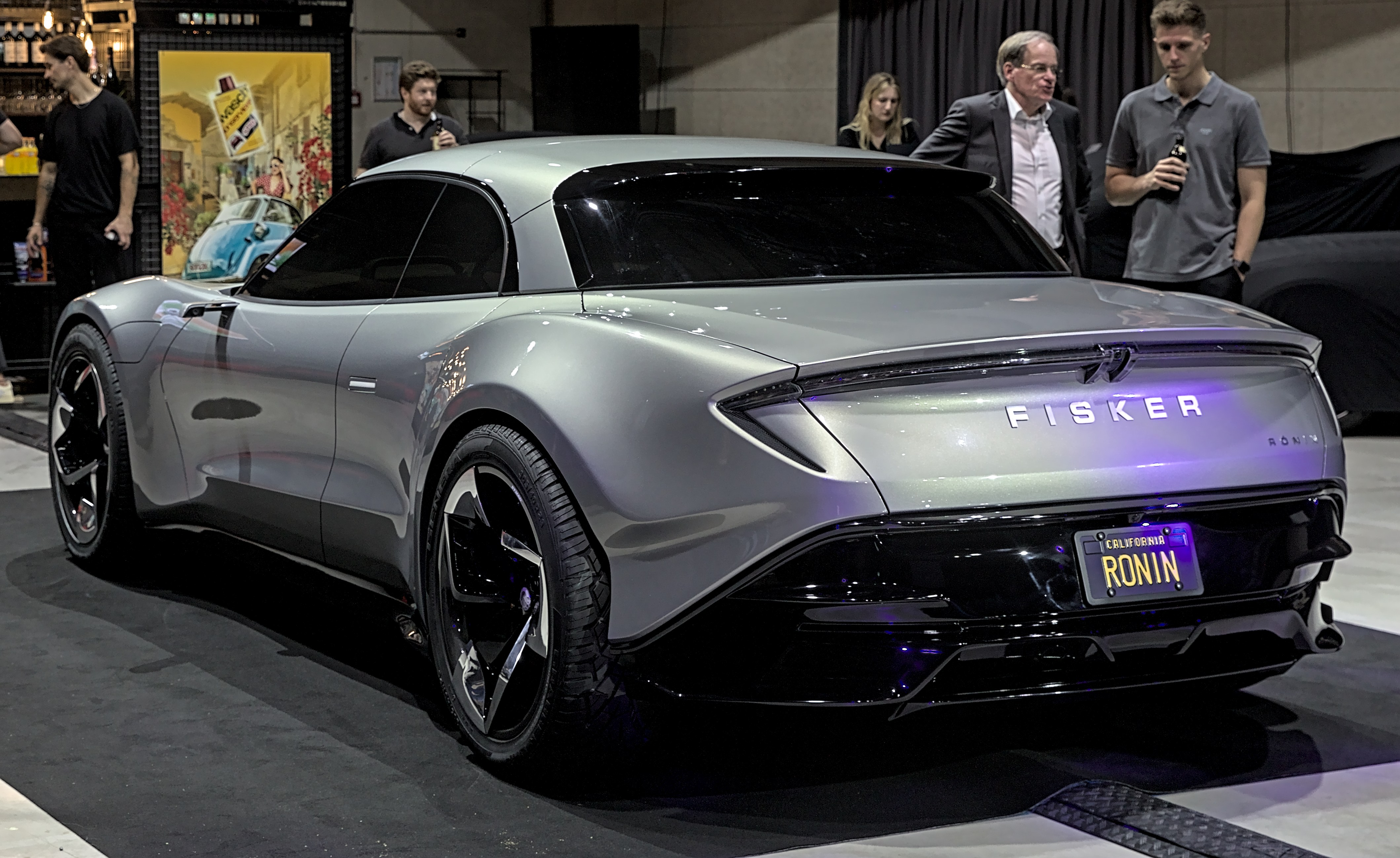
Rear view

On 5 May 2022, Fisker Inc. announced the arrival of a next sports grand tourer (GT) in its range and their third production model, after the Ocean SUV and the Pear crossover.

The Ronin was officially unveiled on 3 August 2023, during Fisker Product Vision Day 2023. It was not a coupé as announced by the press in 2022, but a coupé-cabriolet equipped with a hard folding roof and an electric motor.

Its name refers to the American action film Ronin released in 1998 starring Robert De Niro, known for its car chase scenes.
