= 2023 Munich Motor Show =

- Genre: Auto show
- Begins: September 5, 2023
- Ends: September 10, 2023
- Venue: Messe München
- Country: Germany
- Previous event: 2021 Munich Motor Show
- Next event: 2025 Munich Motor Show
- Organizer: VDA IAA Department
- Website: www.iaa-mobility.com

The 2023 Munich Motor Show (also known as IAA Mobility 2023) was an international auto show held from 5 to 10 September 2023 in Munich, Germany. IAA Open Space and IAA Experience were held concurrently with the show.

== Presentation ==
This was the second edition held in Munich, following the first in 2021, making it a biennial event. The tagline was "Experience Connected Mobility", reflecting the event's focus beyond just automobiles.

=== Attendance ===
The show was open to the public daily from 09:00 to 18:00 between September 5 and 10. The press was allowed to attend the event from September 3.

== Exhibitors ==
Manufacturers present this year:

- (Germany) Audi
- (China) Avatr Technology
- (Germany) BMW
- (China) BYD Auto
- (China) Forthing
- (Spain) Cupra
- (United States) Fisker Inc.
- (South Korea) LG Electronics
- (Canada) Magna International
- (Germany) Mercedes-Benz
- (United Kingdom) MG Motor
- (United Kingdom) Mini
- (Germany) Opel / Vauxhall
- (Germany) Porsche
- (France) Renault
- (China) Smart
- (United States) Tesla
- (Germany) Volkswagen
- (China) XEV

== Introductions ==
=== Production cars ===
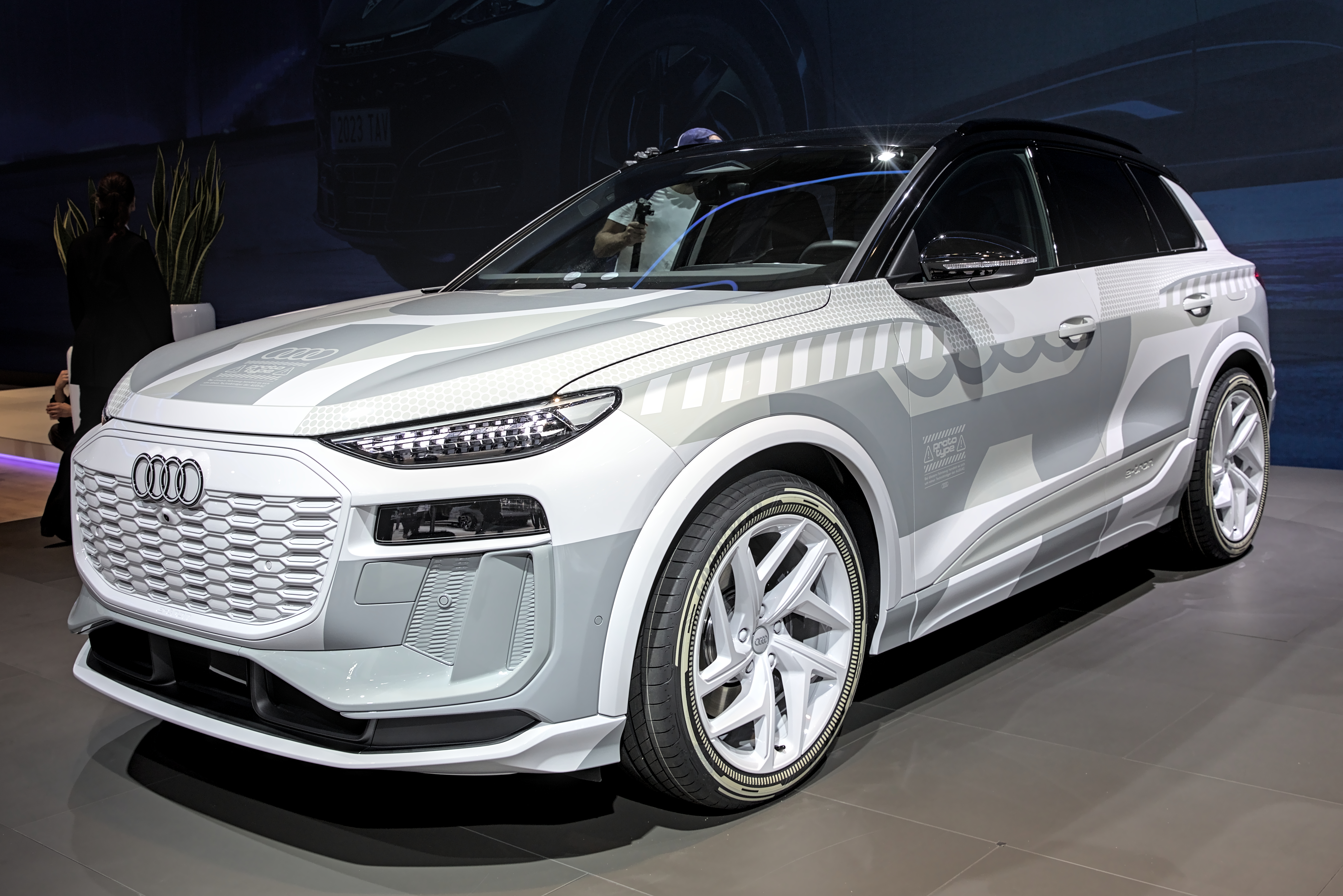
Audi Q6 e-tron

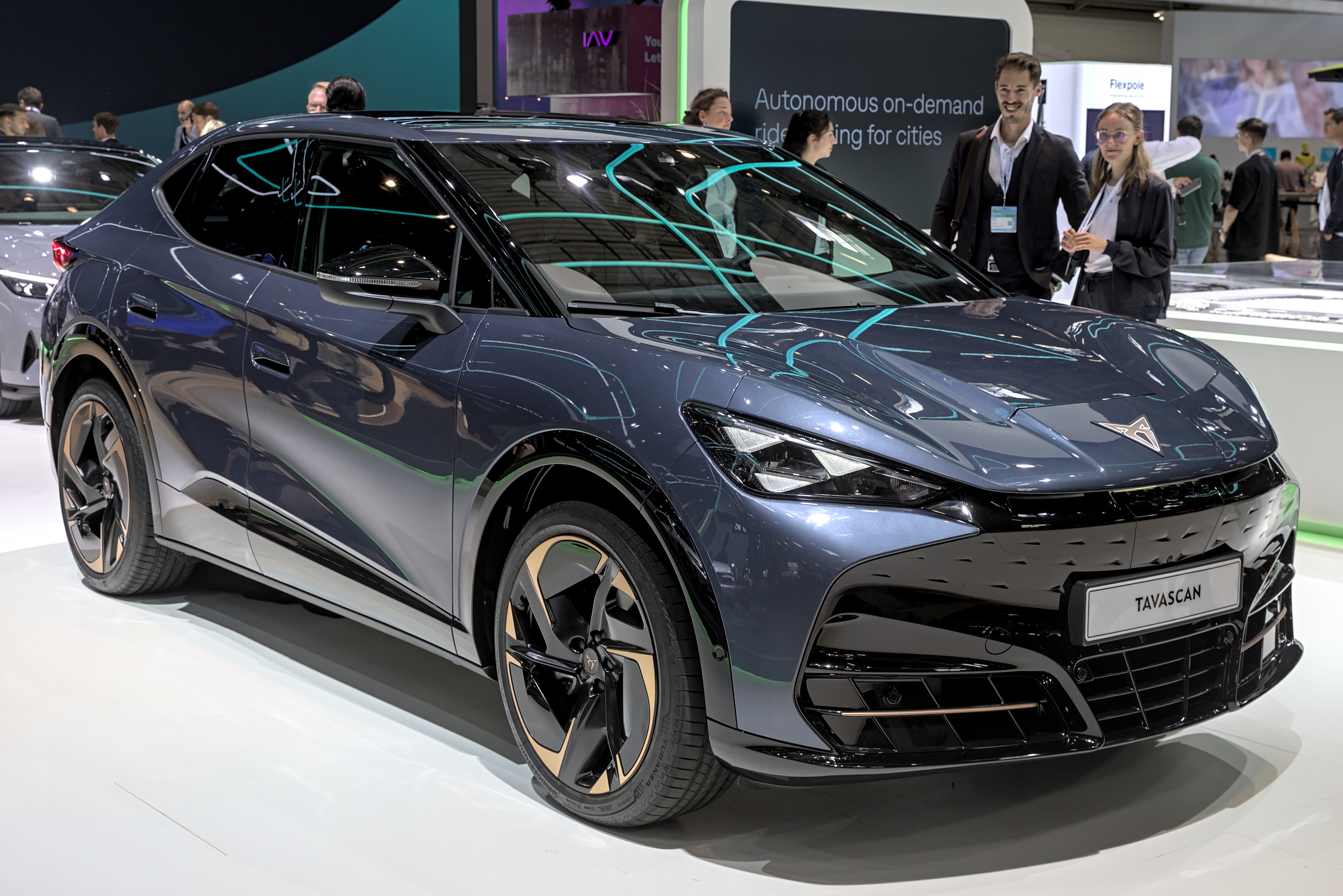
Cupra Tavascan

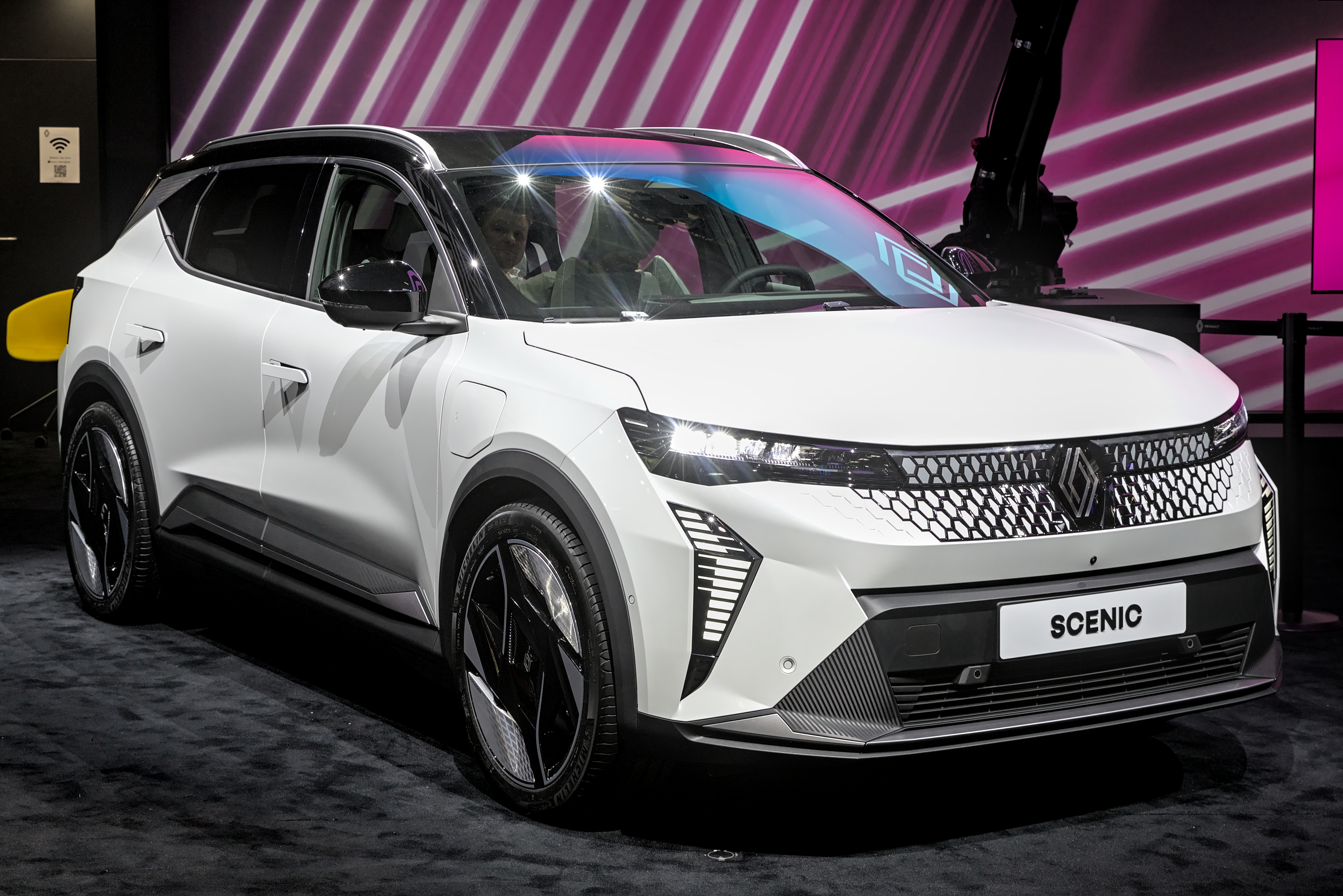
Renault Scenic E-Tech

- Audi Q6 e-tron (prototype)
- Avatr 11
- BMW 5 Series / i5
- BMW 7 Series / i7 Protection
- BYD Dolphin
- BYD Seal
- Cupra Tavascan
- Fisker Pear
- Mercedes-Benz E-Class All-Terrain
- Mercedes-AMG GT
- Mercedes-Benz “Little G” (teased)
- MG Cyberster
- MG4 EV XPower
- MG Marvel R replacement
- Mini Cooper Electric
- Mini Countryman
- Opel Astra Sports Tourer Electric
- Opel Corsa Electric
- Porsche Cayenne Turbo E-Hybrid
- Renault Scenic E-Tech
- Smart #3
- Tesla Model 3 (facelift)
- Volkswagen ID.7 GTX
- Volkswagen Passat (B9)
- Volkswagen Tiguan Mk3 (prototype)
- XEV Yoyo
- Forthing 4U

=== Concept cars ===
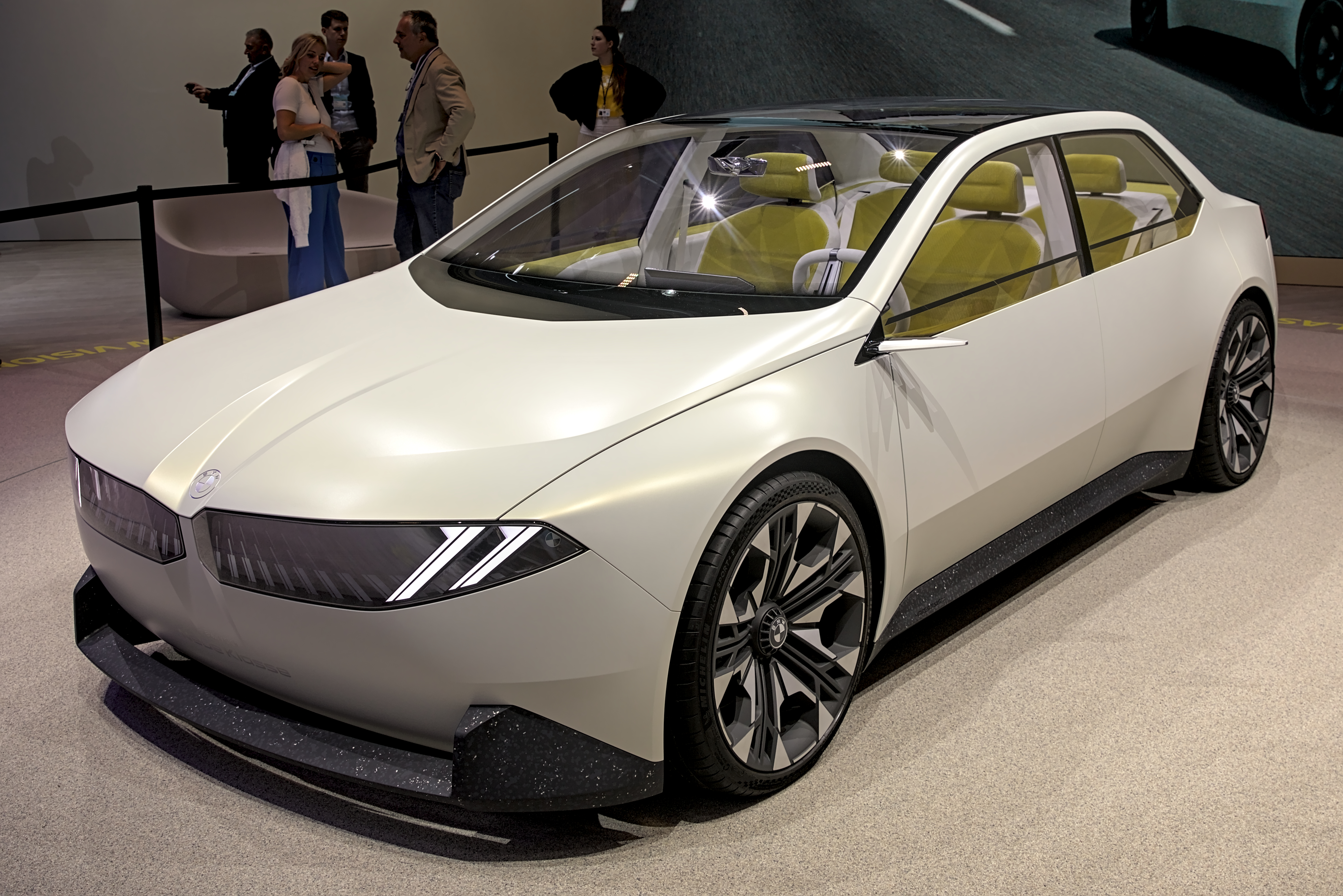
BMW Vision Neue Klasse

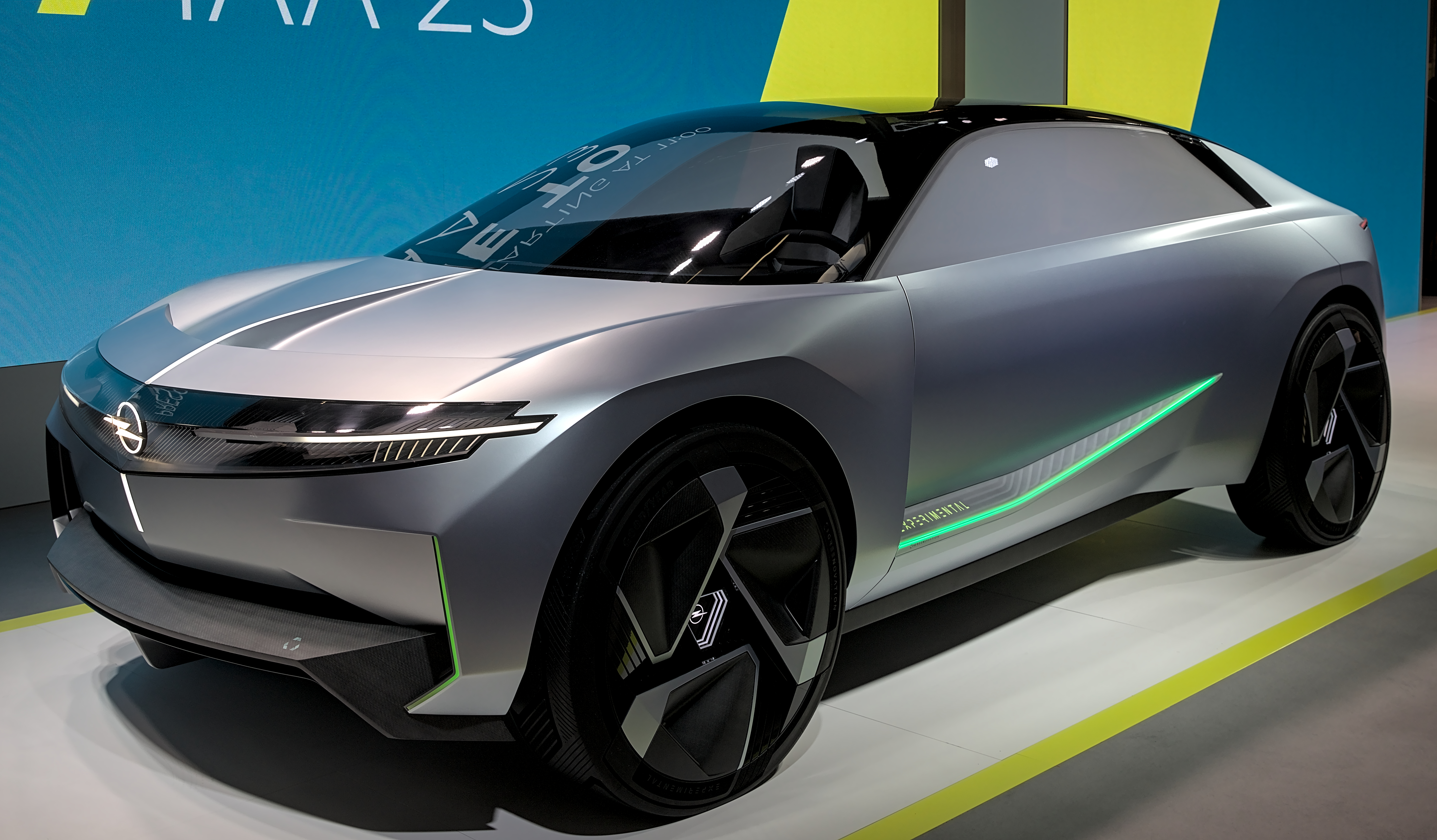
Opel Experimental

- BMW Vision Neue Klasse
- Cupra DarkRebel
- Mercedes-Benz Concept CLA Class
- Opel Experimental
- Porsche Mission X
- Volkswagen ID.GTI

== See also ==
- International Motor Show Germany
- 2022 Paris Motor Show
- Japan Mobility Show
- Geneva International Motor Show
