= Fisker Alaska =

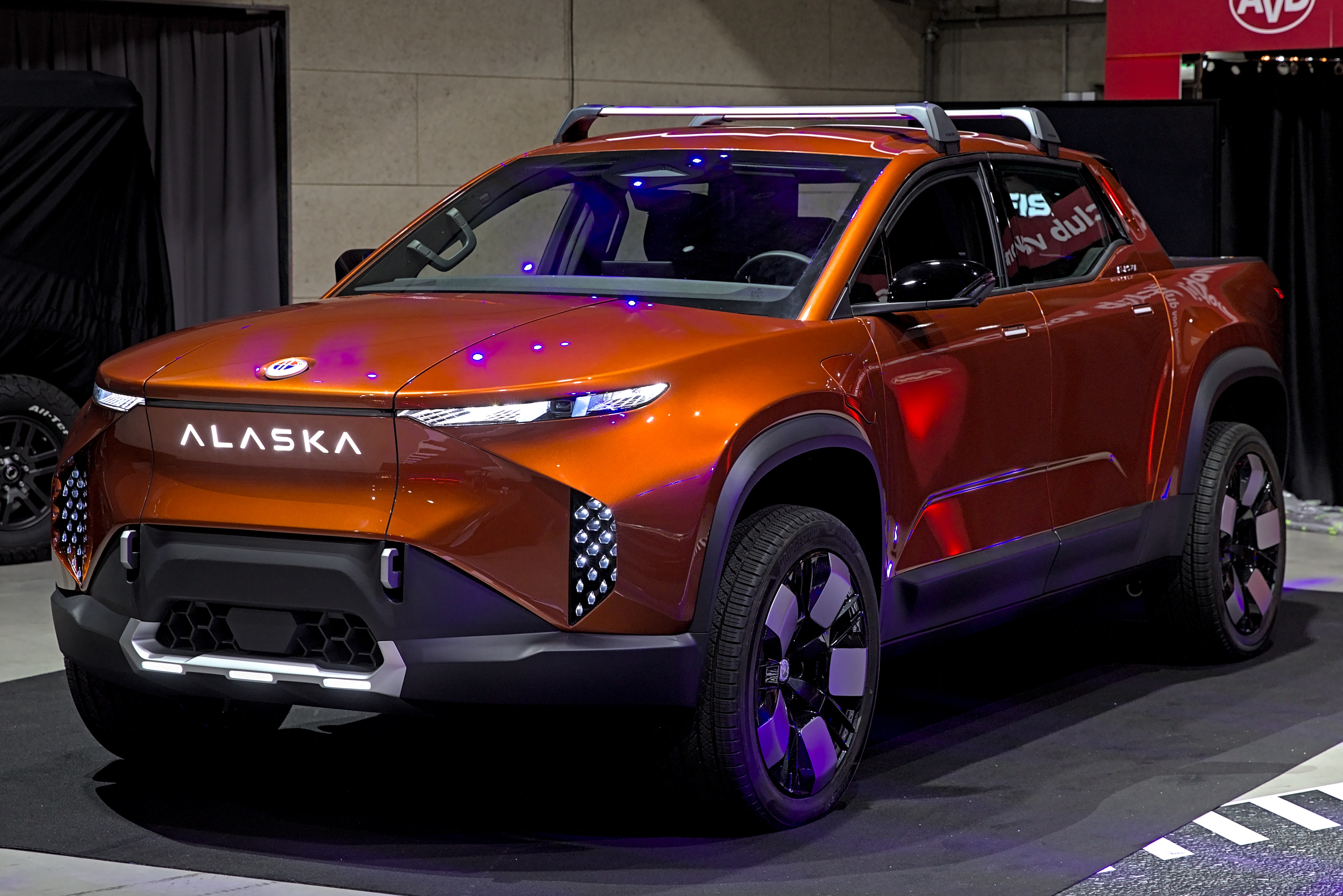

Overview
- Manufacturer: Fisker Inc.
- Also called: Fisker Kayak (Europe)
- Production: Cancelled (as of October 2024)

Body and chassis
- Class: Full-size pickup truck
- Body style: 4-door pickup truck
- Platform: FM31

Powertrain
- Battery: 75 or 113 kWh

The Fisker Alaska, or the Fisker Kayak for the European market, is a cancelled battery electric full-size pickup truck that was developed by Fisker Inc.

== History ==
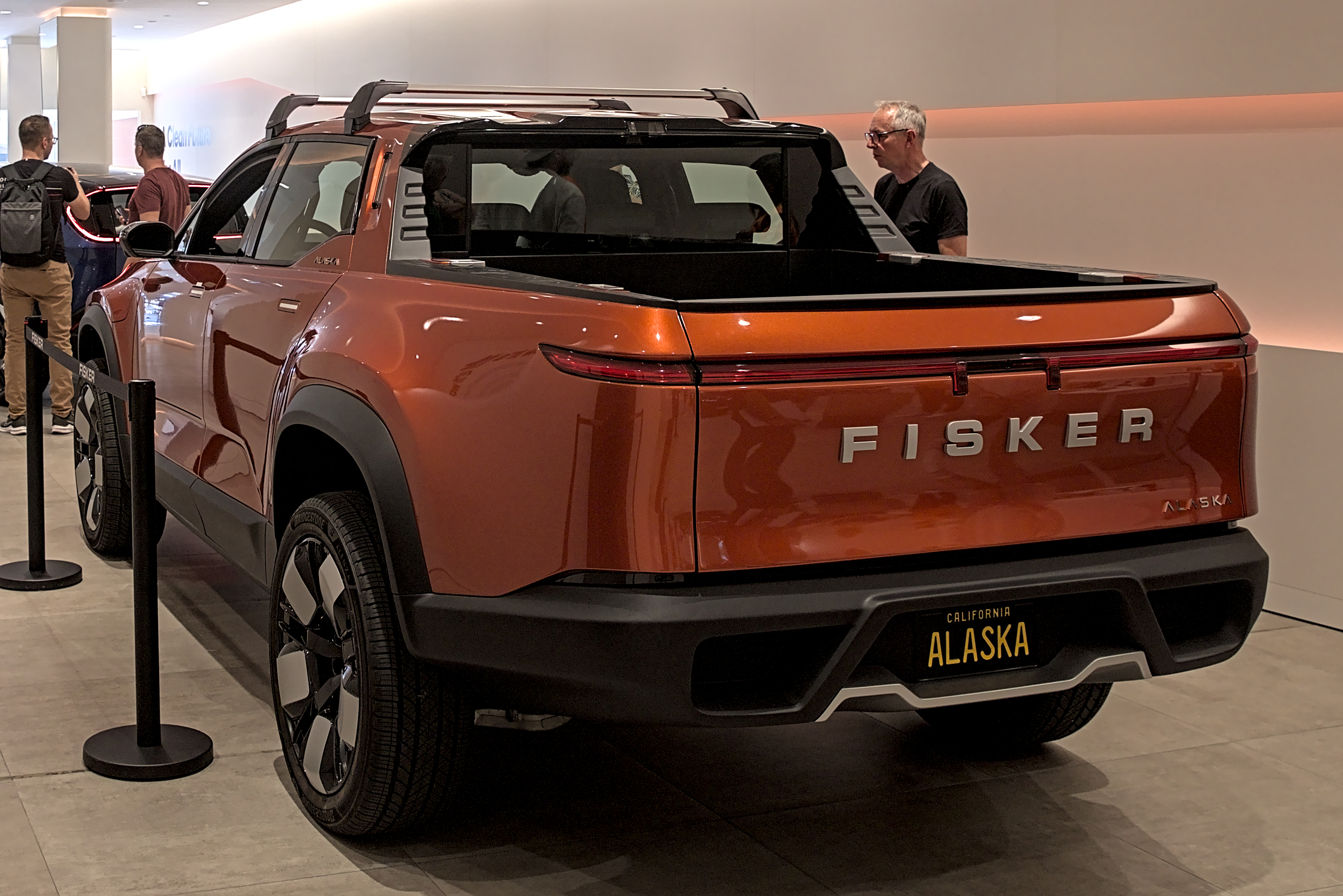
Rear view

In February 2020, Fisker Inc. confirmed plans to expand its planned model range with a full-size electric pickup named Alaska. The appearance of the rear part of the body, reminiscent of the long and narrow lamps of the Ocean SUV, as well as the name was confirmed by Henrik Fisker himself via Twitter, later claiming that he added the entry accidentally, deleting it shortly after publication.

The Fisker Alaska was presented by Fisker on August 4, 2023, during an event in Huntington Beach, California.

Fisker filed for bankruptcy in October 2024, and the Alaska was cancelled and never brought to market.
