= Fisker Inc. =

American electric vehicle company

- Company type: Public
- ISIN: US33813J1060
- Industry: Automotive
- Predecessor: Fisker Automotive, Fisker Coachbuild
- Founded: October 3, 2016; 9 years ago in Los Angeles, California, U.S.
- Founder: Henrik Fisker (Chairman & CEO); Geeta Gupta-Fisker (CFO & COO)
- Fate: Declared bankruptcy in 2024
- Headquarters: Manhattan Beach, California, U.S.
- Area served: U.S. Western Europe; Scandinavia
- Products: Fisker Ocean
- Number of employees: 150 (May 2023)
- Website: fiskerinc.com

Fisker Inc. was an American automotive company founded in 2016 by Danish automotive designer Henrik Fisker and his wife, Geeta Gupta-Fisker. Based in Manhattan Beach, California, Fisker Inc. was the successor to Fisker Automotive.

In the summer of 2020, Fisker Inc. announced an initial public offering on the New York Stock Exchange through a merger with Spartan Energy Acquisition Corp, a SPAC backed by private equity firm Apollo Global Management. The company completed the reverse merger that autumn. Fisker Inc. developed the Fisker Ocean, an electric sport utility vehicle (SUV), which was released in 2023.

In early 2024, the company experienced intense financial difficulties, and its shares were delisted from the NYSE. Fisker defaulted on a short-term loan according to filings with the United States Securities and Exchange Commission and stated there was "substantial doubt" about being able to sustain ongoing operations. It subsequently laid off most of its employees, closed its headquarters, and began substantially reducing the price on the Ocean. By June, it filed for Chapter 11 bankruptcy in US court. A judge's ruling allowed Fisker to postpone Chapter 7 Conversion while allowing the company to continue liquidating its assets. The company and its creditors arrived at a bankruptcy agreement in October of 2024.

== History ==
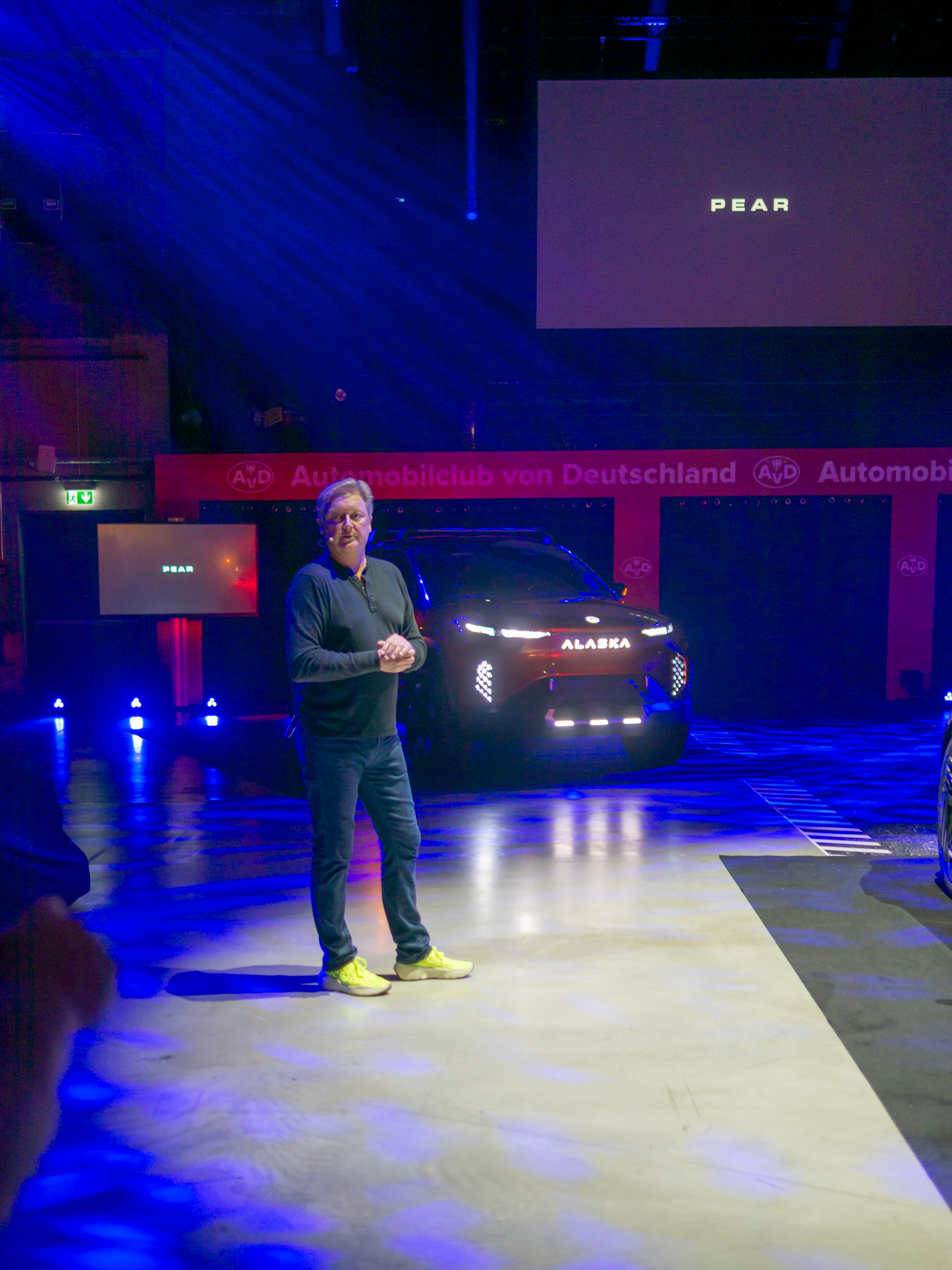
Fisker press event at IAA Mobility with Henrik Fisker highlighting several of the electric vehicles of the company.

In 2007, Henrik Fisker and Bernhard Koehler founded Fisker Automotive. The company produced the Fisker Karma, which debuted in 2008 and was first delivered in 2011. Production was suspended in 2012 due to the bankruptcy of its battery supplier A123 Systems, after approximately 2,000 of the vehicles had been sold worldwide. In 2014, Fisker Automotive's assets were purchased by Wanxiang Group, which renamed its new company Karma Automotive. Henrik Fisker retained the Fisker trademarks and brand.

On October 3, 2016, chairman and CEO Henrik Fisker announced the formation of Fisker Inc. with his wife and co-founder Geeta Gupta-Fisker as president and CFO. On July 8, 2020, Fisker announced the completion of a $50 million Series C financing round funded by Moore Strategic Ventures, the private investment arm of Louis Bacon.

On July 13, 2020, Henrik Fisker announced that Fisker Inc. would offer an initial public offering on the New York Stock Exchange through a merger with special-purpose acquisition company Spartan Energy Acquisition Corp. (NYSE:SPAQ), which is backed by private equity firm Apollo Global Management. The deal valued Fisker Inc. at $2.9 billion. On September 24, 2020, Fisker opened a new technology center in San Francisco, to be a focal point for the development of the company's software and vehicle electronics. On October 14, 2020, Fisker announced its new global headquarters will be located in Manhattan Beach in Los Angeles County, California. On October 29, 2020, Fisker announced it completed the reverse merger with Spartan Energy Acquisition Corp (NYSE:SPAQ). Between October 30, 2020, and April 22, 2024, Fisker was publicly listed and traded on the New York Stock Exchange under the ticker symbols FSR, FSRN, or FSRNQ.

On June 28, 2021, Fisker stock was added to the Russell 3000 Index. On July 28, 2021, Fisker announced it would invest $10 million in private investment in public equity funding in an EV charging company.

Henrik Fisker announced in 2022 that Fisker Inc. would set up its first India entity, a global technology center, in Hyderabad. The company started recruitment for the center and planned to employ 300 software engineers, and to set up a manufacturing plant in India for its PEAR model, in collaboration with Foxconn. Fisker Inc. and Foxconn initially targeted annual production at one million units of the PEAR, which was never constructed.

In June 2023, Fisker announced that it intended to produce vehicles in China. By the end of 2023, Fisker announced that it had “achieved all required approvals and licenses, and satisfied insurance requirements, to sell vehicles in Canada”, and in January 2024, the company announced it would sell vehicles through dealers alongside its direct-to-consumer sales.

Fisker's only production car, the Ocean, has experienced more than 100 loss-of-power incidents as well as other technical problems after delivery, resulting in three National Highway Traffic Safety Administration investigations into different issues and multiple recalls.

=== 2024 financial difficulties ===
In March 2024, due to a net loss of over $463 million in 2023, Fisker announced that it was in financial trouble and did not have the necessary funds to remain in business through the coming year. Due to this, the company reduced its workforce by 15% and paused development of the Pear compact EV. Fisker subsequently entered talks with a major car manufacturer (suspected to be Nissan) regarding a $400 million cash injection (in order to generate cash or reduce costs) in exchange for access to the Fisker Alaska pick-up platform. Several weeks later, The Wall Street Journal reported that Fisker hired financial adviser FTI Consulting and the law firm Davis Polk to work on a potential Chapter 11 bankruptcy filing. As a result, Fisker's stock plummeted approximately 47% shortly after the announcement. The next day, Fisker dismissed talks of a bankruptcy filing, describing plans to engage with its advisors to plan out a deal with another major carmaker.

Nevertheless, Fisker soon announced that it would suspend vehicle production for six weeks in an effort to align inventory levels and progress strategic and financing initiatives. The company warned that bankruptcy was imminent and could occur within weeks. One week later, on March 25, 2024, Fisker announced that the potential deal with the major carmaker had collapsed, and that the company was unable to meet a closing condition for a $150 million lifeline through convertible bond sales. The company's stock trades were halted that morning; hours later, the New York Stock Exchange announced it would delist Fisker's shares. Fisker chose not to appeal the delisting, which happened on April 22.

On April 23, Fisker warned that they may have to file for bankruptcy protection within 30 days if it was unable to meet debt obligations and get adequate relief from its creditors. Further on May 8 Fisker's Austrian subunit filed for bankruptcy protection.

In an article published on May 31, eight Fisker employees spoke to TechCrunch describing the dire situation at the company over the past few years. The company lost track of payments made, taking months to complete an internal audit, with external auditor PwC receiving inadequate documentation from Fisker to compile their annual financial report. Fisker CFO and COO, Geeta Gupta-Fisker attempted to run customer service using a digital chatbot, rather than a call center, leading to customers struggling to get help with their cars. Fisker then hired a company to provide customer service, which later sued Fisker for failure to pay, alleging debts over $660,000. Gupta-Fisker also allegedly refused to build a stockpile of parts for service, in order to cut costs. The company did not set up a supplier quality team to audit suppliers, leading to substandard quality of parts on vehicles. In order to service cars, Fisker started "pinching" parts from their supplier Magna Steyr's production line in Austria, stripping down returned cars and cars used for marketing, as well as CEO Henrik Fisker's own Ocean. The supplier's employees were also asked to bring parts from Austria to the US in their luggage to solve the crisis. Fisker is also involved in legal proceedings initiated by several of its suppliers for alleged non-payment, including some entities that were providing Fisker with engineering services for the Pear and Alaska.

On March 27, employees were told that the company would immediately lose access to its Manhattan Beach headquarters, leading to panic, before being told they had another month. A backlog of registration paperwork meant that customers were left without permanent license plates for months. Customers who bought a special edition version of the Ocean, called the Ocean One, were entitled to $7,500 of benefits, amounting to $37.5 million in total for the 5,000 units sold, none of which was paid out. The company was also desperate to get rid of unsold Oceans, after losing access to its storage facilities. They promised $1,000 in bonuses per vehicle to sales staff who sold vehicles directly without a dealership, and also set up "dealership partners" to sell vehicles on consignment. Fisker's VP of communications Matthew DeBord denied most of these claims.

=== Bankruptcy ===
On June 17, 2024, Fisker filed for Chapter 11 bankruptcy protection in Delaware, listing liabilities at between $100 million to $500 million and assets between $500 million and $1 billion. The company stated that possible deal talks with a big automaker collapsed, which led it to its bankruptcy. Fisker is planning to repay its creditors during the bankruptcy proceedings.

The next month, a bankruptcy judge cleared the sale of its remaining Oceans to New York leasing company American Leasing for $46.25 million or approximately $14,000 each. By August, the U.S. Bankruptcy Court in Delaware reached an agreement to postpone Chapter 7 Conversion while Fisker continues to liquidate their assets. Numerous objections to the conversion were brought up in court, where the Fisker Owners Association (FOA), a community and resource hub to "help Ocean owners" with maintaining their vehicles, had argued that Fisker should be required to ensure that their vehicles remain safe and operable. The judge agreed to allow the FOA to have a voice in the sale of intellectual property, including the equipment needed to maintain the current cloud based software that the cars rely on for over-the-air updates. In October, American Leasing agreed to spend another $2.5 million for tech support, allowing the vehicles' software to be updated. Fisker's intellectual property is being given to its creditors per the terms of the bankruptcy agreement.

== Vehicles ==
=== Released ===
==== Fisker Ocean ====
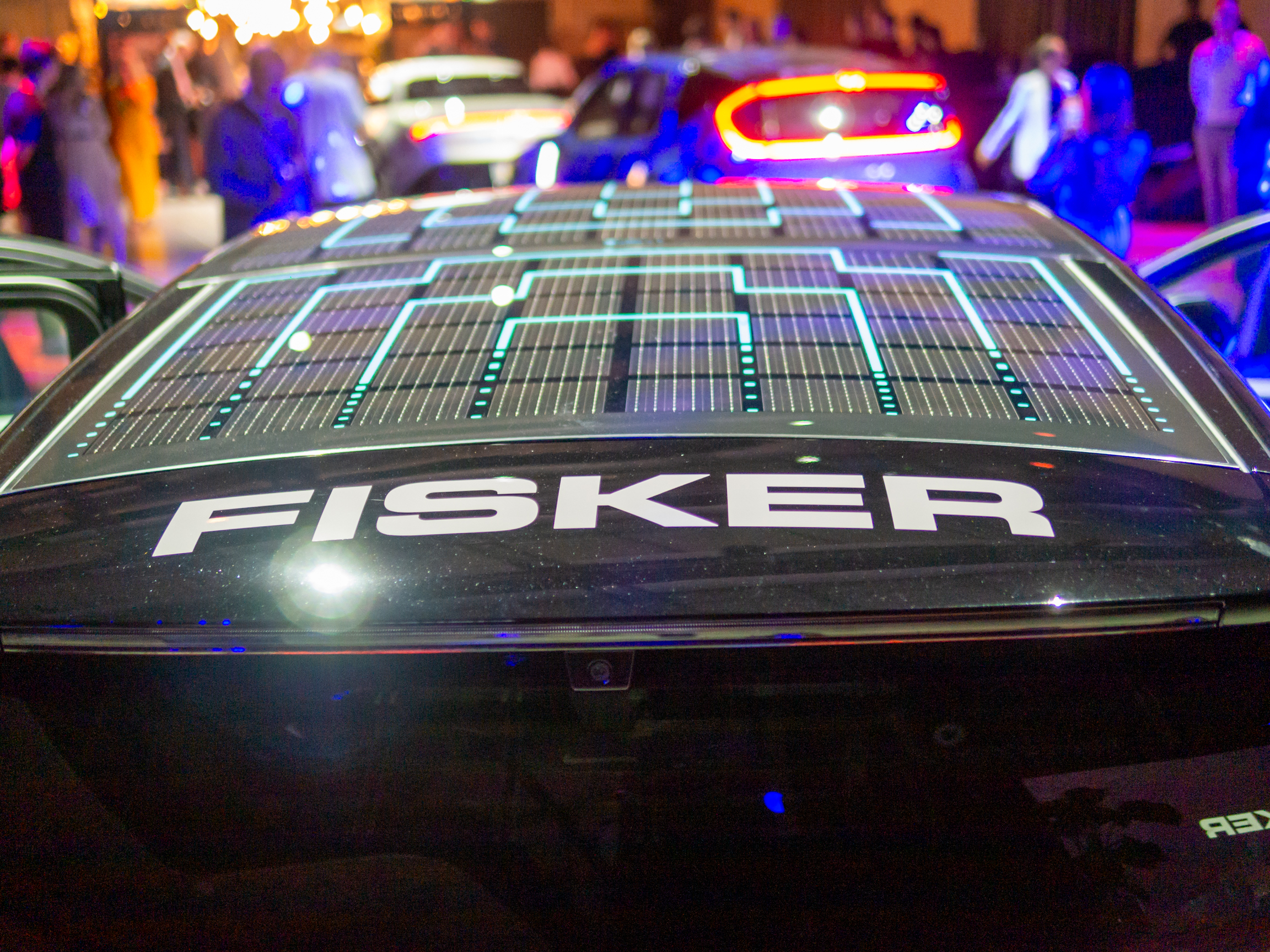
One sustainable element is renewable energy captured by a solar roof adding around 1,500 miles a year.

On March 18, 2019, Fisker announced an all-electric SUV to be launched in 2021. It was intended to be the first of three in a lineup of mass-market all-electric vehicles designed by Henrik Fisker and originally planned to be produced in the US. Later named the Fisker Ocean, the company advertised that it would have a range of "close to 300 miles", available on the lowest-cost option.

The SUV was offered in both front- and all-wheel drive. The company stated that it would be supplied by a lithium-ion battery pack with a capacity of around 80 kWh and a solar panel roof as a range extender, adding around 1,500 miles of range per year. The company claimed it was being designed with a large number of recycled materials and with sustainability in mind.

=== Prototypes ===
==== Fisker Pear ====
The Pear was an "urban" electric vehicle planned by Fisker. The company intended to charge $29,900 before taxes and incentives in the US. The Pear was planned to be built at Foxconn's plant in Lordstown, Ohio using the Foxconn MIH EV platform with an initial production target of 250,000 annually. However, as of October 2024, the Pear has been cancelled due to Fisker filing for bankruptcy.

==== Fisker Ronin ====
A prototype of a sports car called the Fisker Ronin was unveiled on 3 August 2023.

==== Fisker Alaska ====
A prototype of a pickup truck called the Fisker Alaska was unveiled on 3 August 2023.

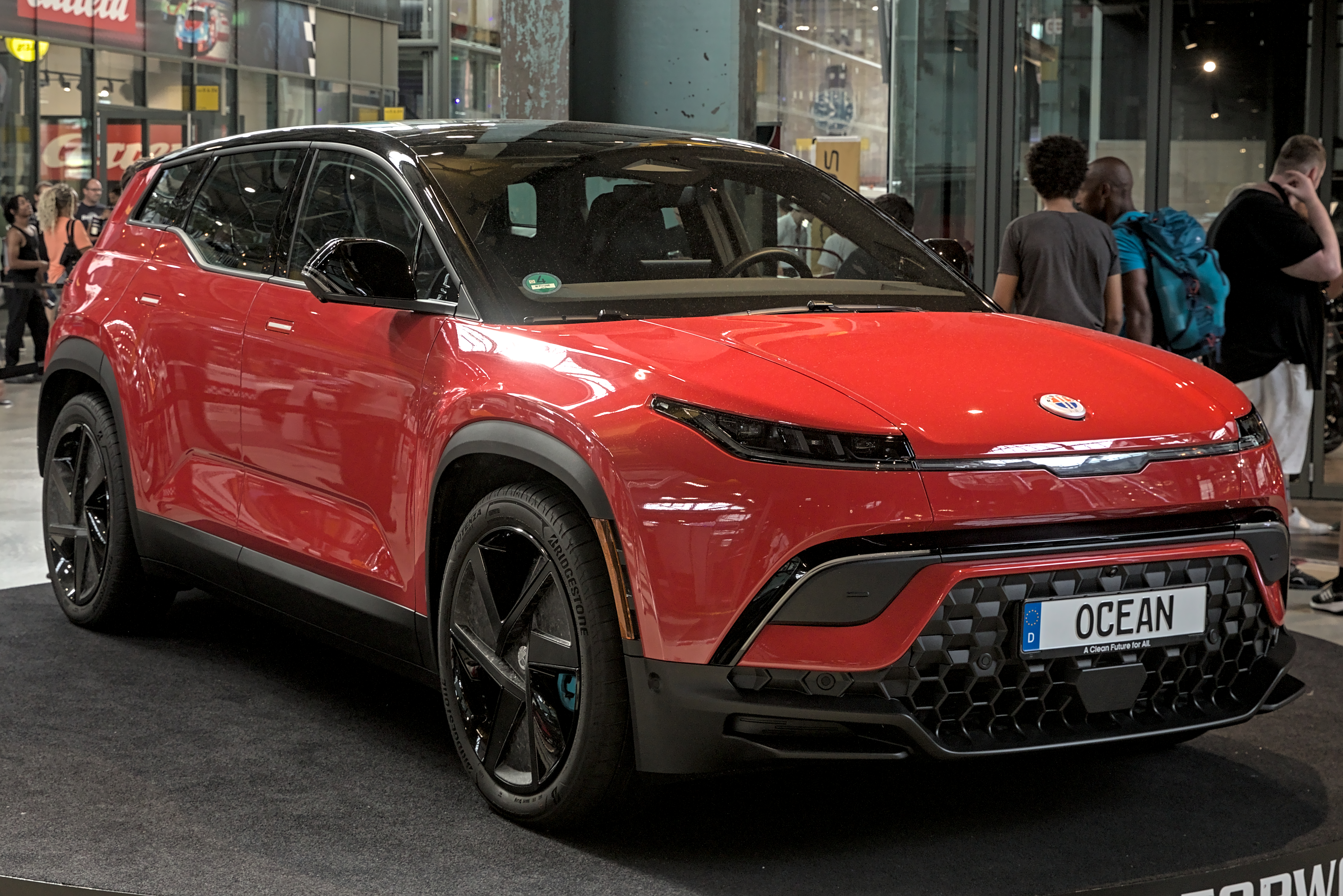
Fisker Ocean

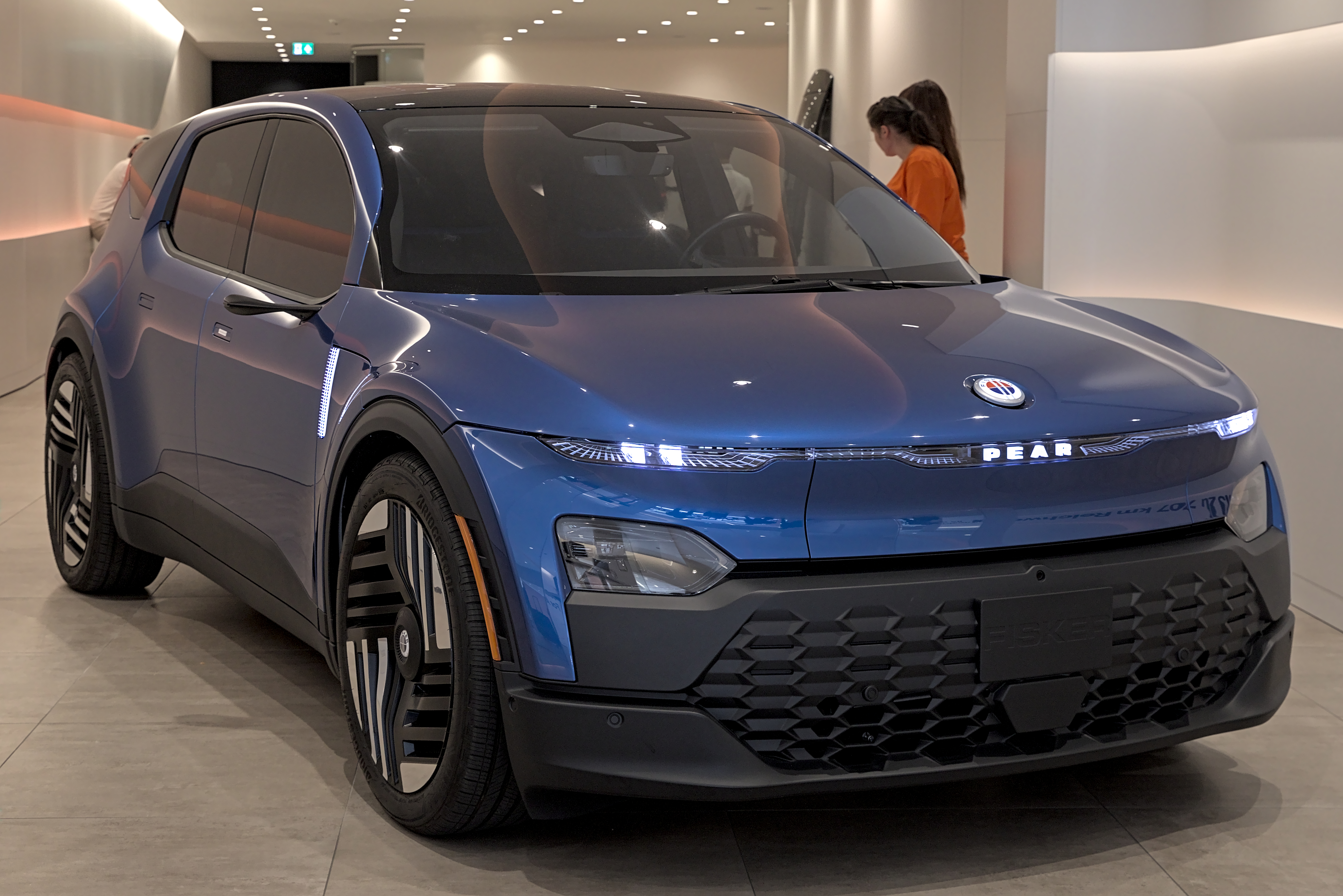
Fisker Pear

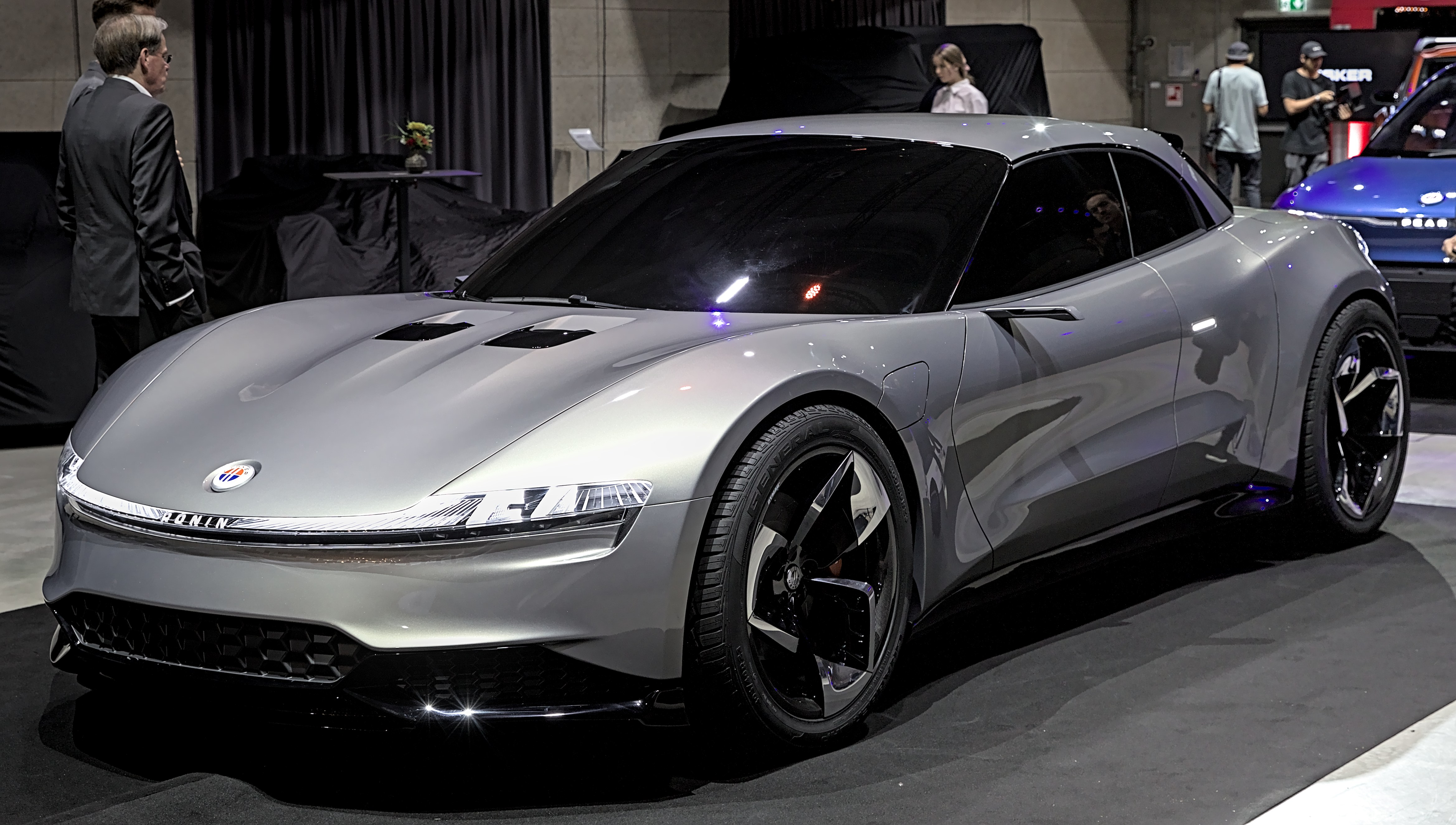
Fisker Ronin

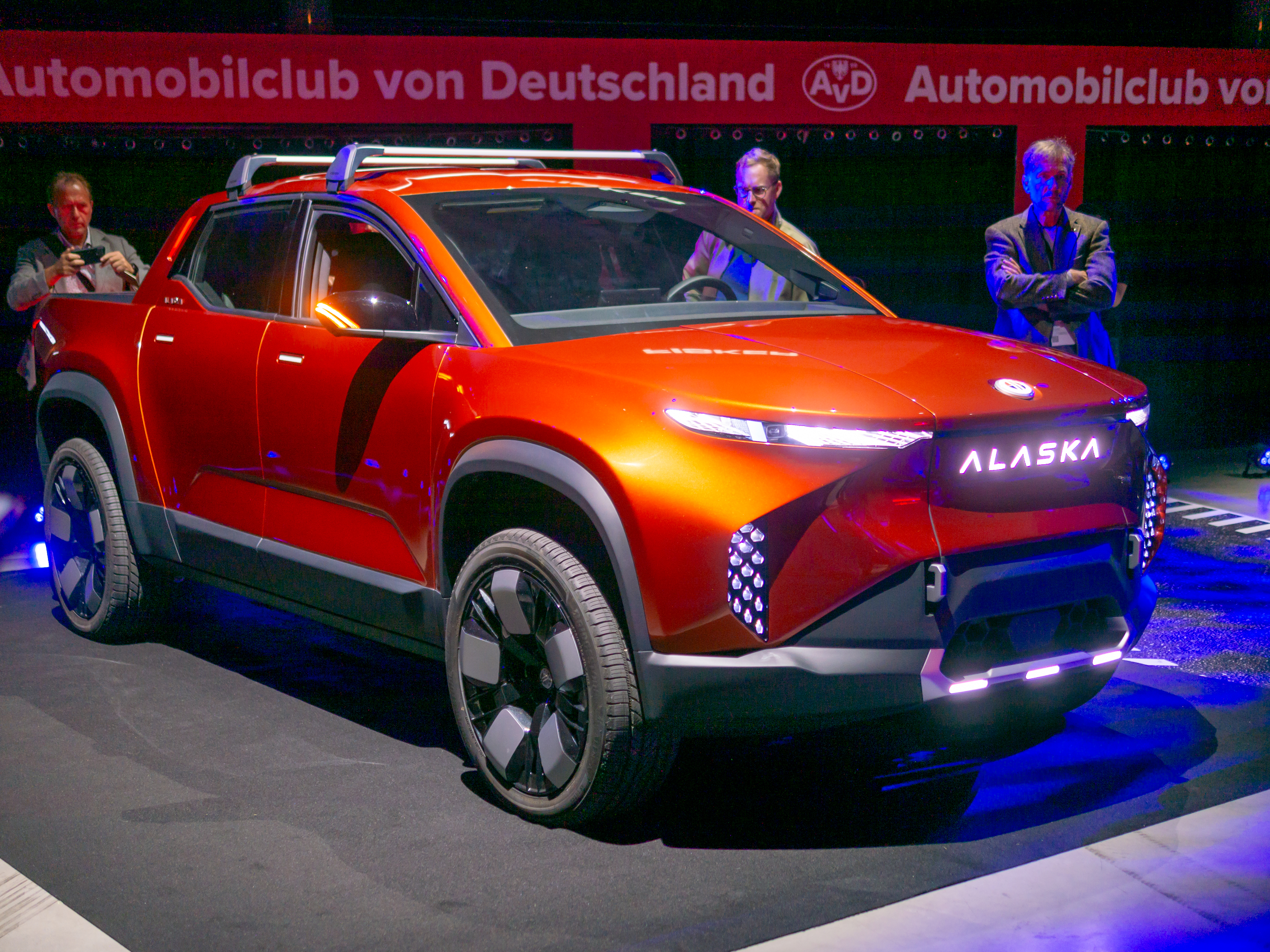
Fisker Alaska

== Technology initiatives ==
=== Unsuccessful nanotech partnership ===
In 2016, Fisker Inc. teamed up with Nanotech Energy to create a joint venture called Fisker Nanotech, with Jack Kavanaugh as chairman. They worked on developing a next-generation supercapacitor technology using graphene. The proposed hybrid battery using graphene supercapacitors had the potential for improved energy conducting and charging capabilities, and a better cycle life, so that the battery would not need to be swapped out as often as a pure lithium-ion battery. In July 2017, Fisker Inc. ended its joint venture with Nanotech Energy to produce batteries using graphene.

=== Unsuccessful solid-state battery research ===
On November 13, 2017, Fisker Inc. announced that it had filed patents on flexible solid-state battery designs, expecting the batteries to be produced on a mass scale around 2023. A prototype of the battery, which included 21700 NCM cells from LG Chem, debuted at the Consumer Electronics Show in January 2018. Fisker's development team included Fabio Albano, one of the founders of Sakti3, the solid-state battery startup sold to Dyson in 2015. Solid-state batteries have greater energy density and faster charging times than lithium-ion batteries. In October 2018, Fisker Inc. announced new funding through Caterpillar Venture Capital, a subsidiary of the Caterpillar Inc. heavy-machinery manufacturing company, with the money going toward development of Fisker Inc.'s solid-state battery technology. In 2021 Fisker dropped its plans to use solid-state batteries; Henrik Fisker stated that the company could not make the technology work successfully.

== See also ==
- Fisker Coachbuild (2005–07)
- Tesla, Inc.
- Faraday Future
- Rivian
- Lucid Motors
