= Magna MILA Plus =

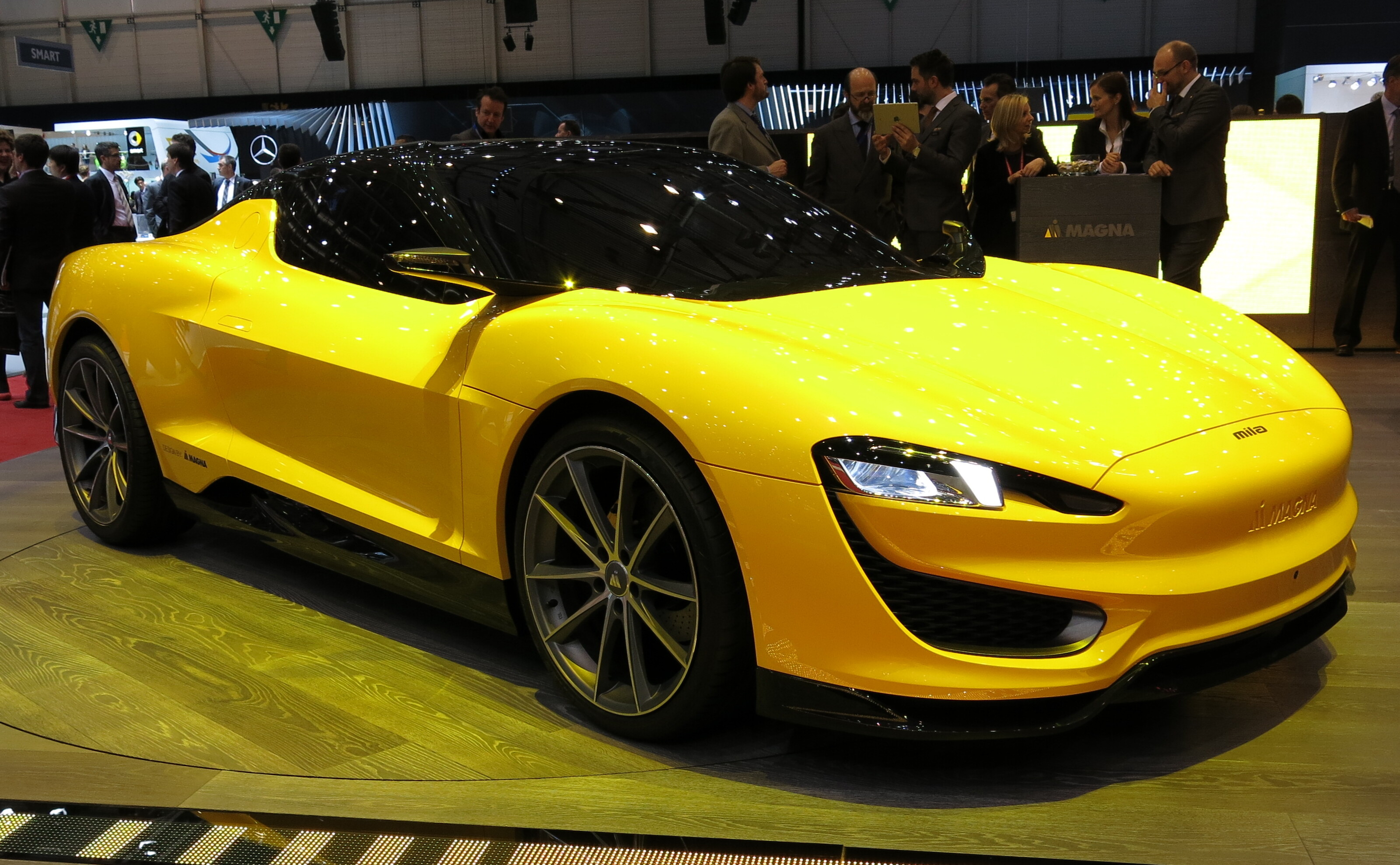

Overview
- Manufacturer: Magna Steyr
- Also called: Magna Steyr MILA Plus
- Production: 2015

Body and chassis
- Class: Sports car (S); Concept car
- Body style: 2-door coupé

Dimensions
- Wheelbase: 2,575 mm (101.4 in)
- Length: 4,403 mm (173.3 in)
- Width: 1,925 mm (75.8 in)
- Height: 1,250 mm (49.2 in)
- Curb weight: 1,520 kg (3,351 lb)

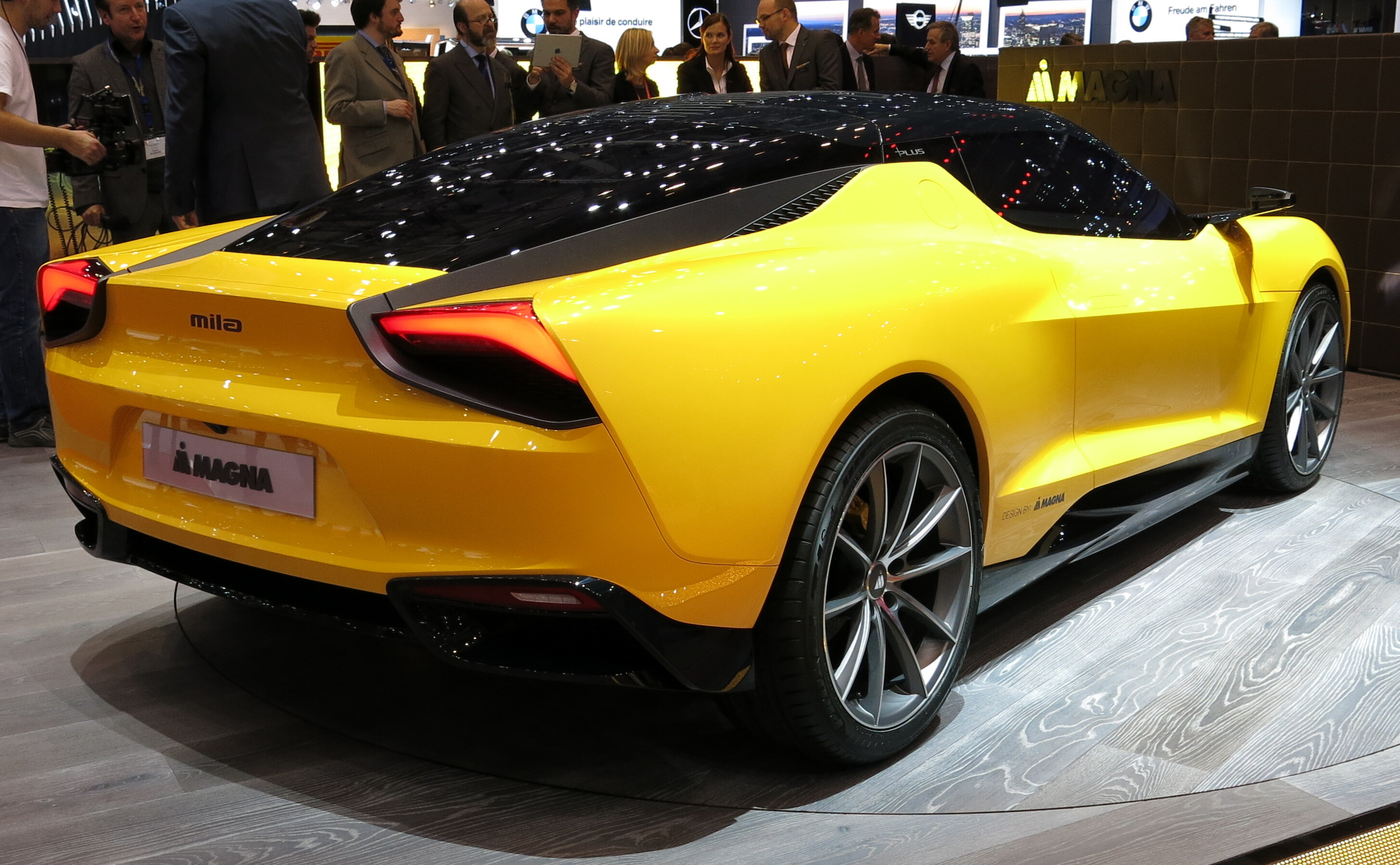
Rear view

The Magna MILA Plus is a hybrid electric concept car developed by the Austrian automobile manufacturer Magna Steyr, presented at the 2015 Geneva Motor Show.

== History ==
The MILA Plus uses a bonded aluminum spaceframe chassis structure, with batteries integrated into the spaceframe, and plastic body panels, giving the car a total weight of 1,520 kg (3,351 lb). The concept is a plug-in hybrid, and is powered by a three-cylinder engine paired with two electric motors, reportedly producing 270 hp (201 kW) and 428 lb⋅ft (580 N⋅m) of torque and sending power to all four wheels. Magna Steyr say this allows the car to accelerate from 0-100 km/h (62 mph) in 4.9 seconds, and achieve an all-electric range of 75 km (47 mi). The interior uses a number of renewable and recyclable materials in its design, such as natural fibers and bioplastics.

Like previous Magna Steyr concept vehicles, the MILA Plus was designed to showcase their manufacturing methods and new construction technologies.
