= Magna Steyr =

Automobile manufacturer

MAGNA STEYR Fahrzeugtechnik GmbH & Co KG

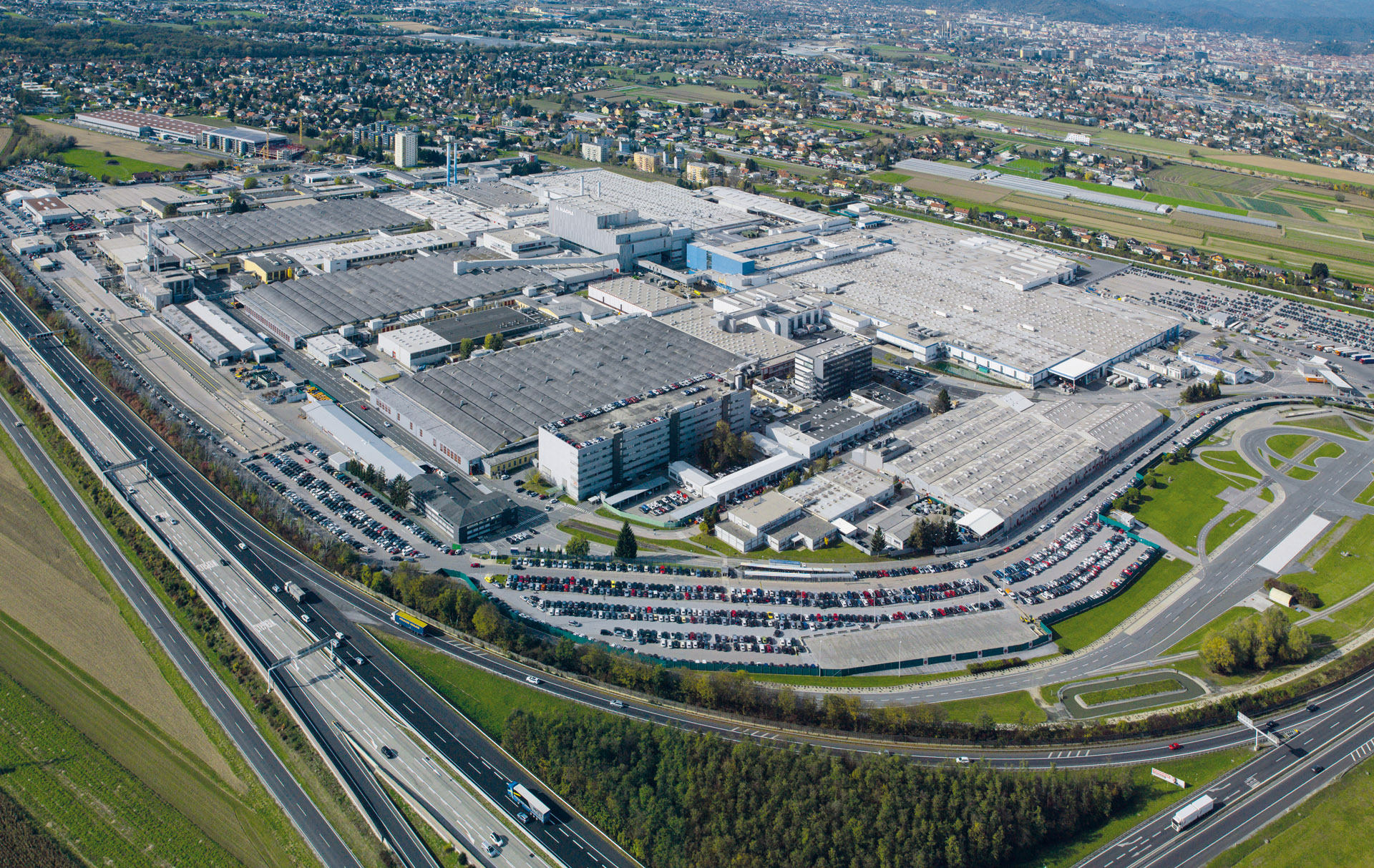
- Magna Steyr plant in Graz, Austria
- Type: Limited public partnership (GmbH & KG)
- Industry: Automotive; Contract manufacturing
- Predecessor: Steyr-Daimler-Puch
- Founded: 2001
- Founder: Frank Stronach
- Headquarters: Graz, Austria
- Key people: Roland Prettner, President
- Products: Complete vehicle automobile manufacturing, automobile components
- Services: Consultancy services
- Number of employees: 13,500 (2022)
- Parent: Magna International
- Website: www.magna.com

Magna Steyr Fahrzeugtechnik GmbH & Co KG is an automobile manufacturer based in Graz, Styria, Austria, where its primary manufacturing plant is also located. It is a subsidiary of Canadian Magna International and was previously part of the Steyr-Daimler-Puch conglomerate.

Magna Steyr engineers develop and assemble automobiles for other companies on a contractual basis; therefore, Magna Steyr is not an automobile marque. In 2002, the company absorbed Daimler AG's Eurostar vehicle assembly facility. With an annual production capacity of approximately 200,000 vehicles as of 2018, it is the largest contract manufacturer for automobiles worldwide. The company has several manufacturing sites, with its main car production in Graz in Austria.

Magna Steyr developed Mercedes-Benz's "4Matic" all-wheel drive (AWD) system, and was the sole manufacturer of all E-Class 4Matic models between 1996 and 2006. The company also undertook substantial development on the BMW X3 and manufactured all original X3s (model code E83), and early Aston Martin Rapides. The company developed several cars on behalf of manufacturers such as the Audi TT, Fiat Bravo and Peugeot RCZ.

== History ==
Magna Steyr GmbH & Co KG was founded in 2001 after Magna International Inc. acquired a majority shareholding in Steyr-Daimler-Puch AG three years earlier.

During the second quarter of 2015, the Magna Steyr battery pack business was sold to Samsung SDI for approximately $120 million.

== Production ==
=== Current ===
- Mercedes-Benz G-Class (1979–present)
- W Motors Fenyr SuperSport (2019–present)
- Aion UT (2025–present)
- Aion V (2025–present)
- XPeng G6 (2025–present)
- XPeng G9 (2025–present)
- XPeng P7+ (2026–present)
- XPeng G9L (2026-present)

In March 2017, Magna Steyr started to produce the new BMW 5 Series sedan; production was shared with BMW Group's manufacturing plant in Dingolfing, Germany, until the new eight generation of the 5 Series.

In early December 2016, Magna International announced it will build the new Jaguar I-Pace, the company’s first battery electric vehicle. Jaguar later said Magna Steyr will also assemble its E-Pace crossover, starting later in 2017 and ending in 2024. Magna Steyr confirmed the deal following Jaguar's announcement. Production for the I-Pace started in early 2018 and ended in 2024.

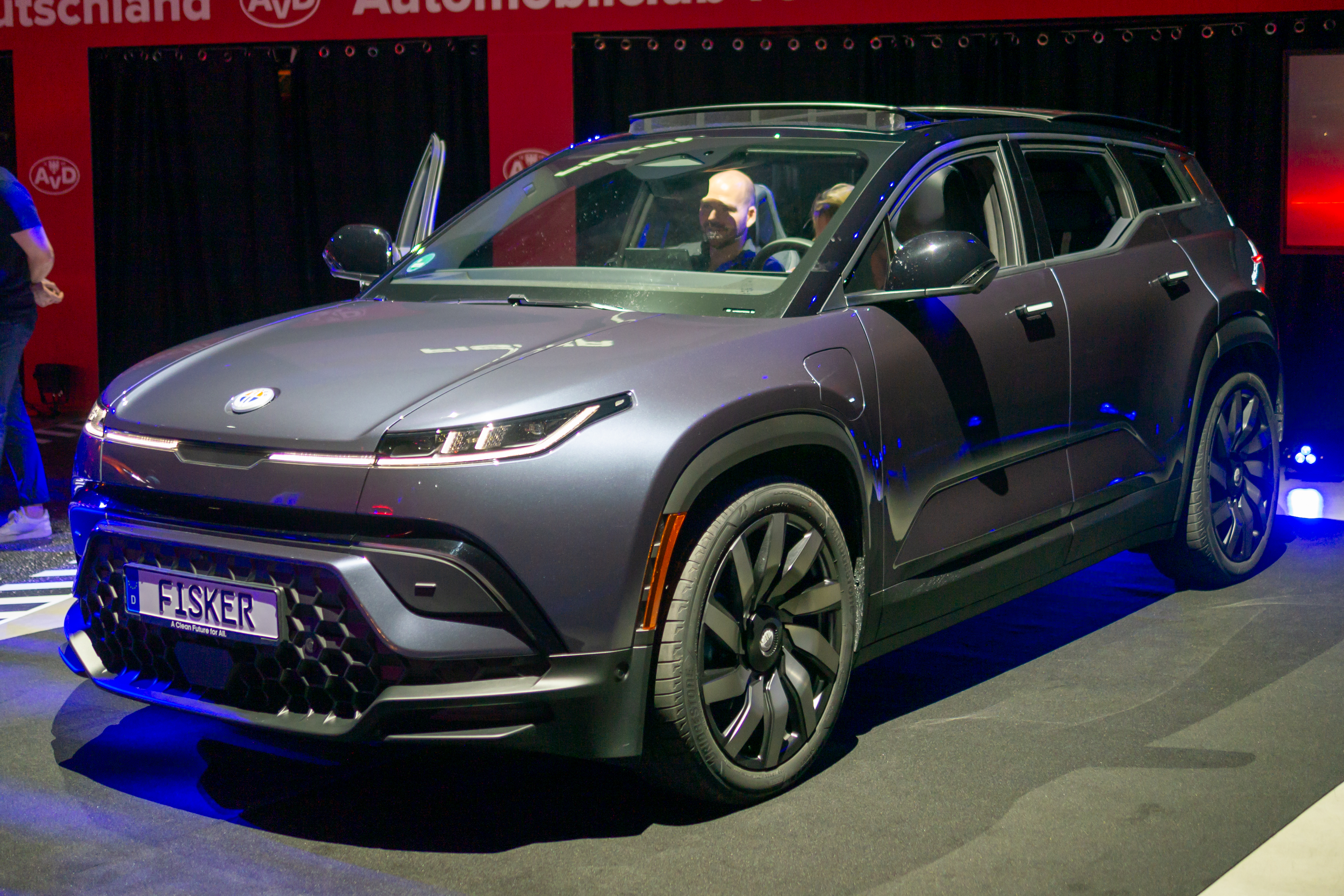
Fisker Ocean

In January 2020, Sony presented a concept car, the Sony Vision-S, which was developed and built in cooperation with Magna Steyr. In October 2020, Magna International announced it would build a new electric vehicle, the Fisker Ocean, while taking a 6% ownership interest in Fisker Inc. Also the Ineos Grenadier 4x4 has been developed with expertise from Magna Steyr, with subsidiary Magna Powertrain working on the development of the chassis and suspension and the car being built at the former Smartville plant at Hambach in France.

=== Past models ===
- Voiturette (1904)
- Alpenwagen (1919)
- Puch 500/650/700c/126 (1957–1975)
- Haflinger (1959–1974)
- Pinzgauer (1971–2000)
- Bitter SC (1983-1989)
- Volkswagen Transporter T3 4x4 (1984–1992)
- Volkswagen Golf Country (1990–1991)
- Audi V8L (1990–1994)
- Chrysler Voyager (April 1992 – December 2007)
- Jeep Grand Cherokee ZG, WG (1992–2004)
- Mercedes-Benz E-Class W210 (1996–2002) (all-wheel-drive)
- Mercedes-Benz M-Class W163 (1999–2002)
- Chrysler PT Cruiser PG (FY & FZ) (Jul 2001 – Jul 2002)
- Mercedes-Benz E-Class W211 (2003–2006) (all-wheel-drive)
- Mercedes-Benz E-Class S211 (2003—2009) (wagon)
- Saab 9-3 Convertible (2003–2009)
- BMW X3 (2003–2010)
- Chrysler 300C LE (2005–2010)
- Jeep Grand Cherokee WH (2005–2010)
- Jeep Commander XH (2006–2010)
- Mercedes-Benz SLS AMG (painted aluminum body) (2009–2014)
- Peugeot RCZ (2009–2015)
- Aston Martin Rapide (2010–2012)
- Mini Countryman (2010–2016)
- Mini Paceman (2012–2016)
- BMW 5 Series (2017–2023)
- Jaguar E-Pace (2017–2024)
- Jaguar I-Pace (2018–2024)
- BMW Z4 (2018–2026)
- Toyota GR Supra (2019–2026)
- Fisker Ocean (2022–2024)

=== Car components ===
- Mercedes-Benz SLK vario-roof assembly – over 500,000 produced since 1996
- Opel Astra TwinTop convertible roof assembly – 2005–2010

=== Rear differential ===
- FIAT Panda 4x4 mod. 141 (1986–2003) with name Steyr-Puch
- FIAT Panda 4x4 and Panda 4x4 Cross mod. 319 (since 2012)
- Renault Scenic RX4 (2000-2003)

=== Cancelled contracts ===
Porsche had announced in June 2008 that the Boxster and Cayman models would be manufactured by Magna Steyr from 2012, but this contract was cancelled in December 2009 and transferred to Karmann, a German car assembly company which was recently taken over by Porsche's parent company, Volkswagen. After Fisker cancelled the orders for the Fisker Ocean, 500 employees had to be laid off at the main plant in Graz.

== MILA ==
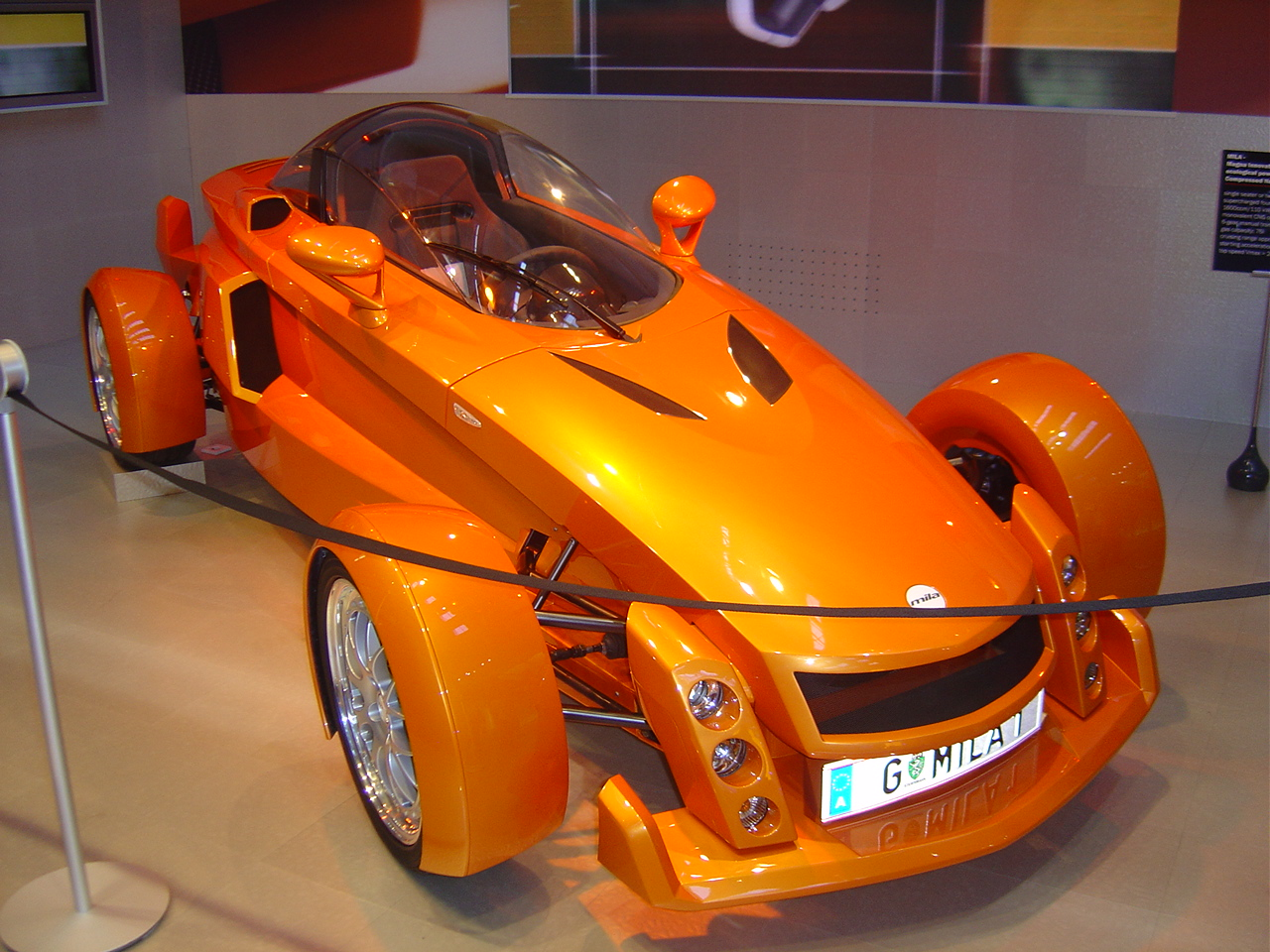
Magna Steyr MILA Concept

Magna Steyr created the MILA (Magna Innovation Lightweight Auto) brand for its technology and research. Several concept cars have been shown at motor shows under the MILA name.

=== MILA Concept ===
The MILA was presented at the IAA in Frankfurt in 2005 as a one-seater sports car concept. The first prototype of the CNG-powered vehicle was built in 2006. Mila 2, the two-seater version, followed.

=== MILA Future ===
Presented at the 2007 Geneva Motor Show, the Mila Future is a sculpture with four roof options: coupé, landaulet, coupster (a crossover between a coupé and a roadster) and roadster.

=== MILA Alpin ===
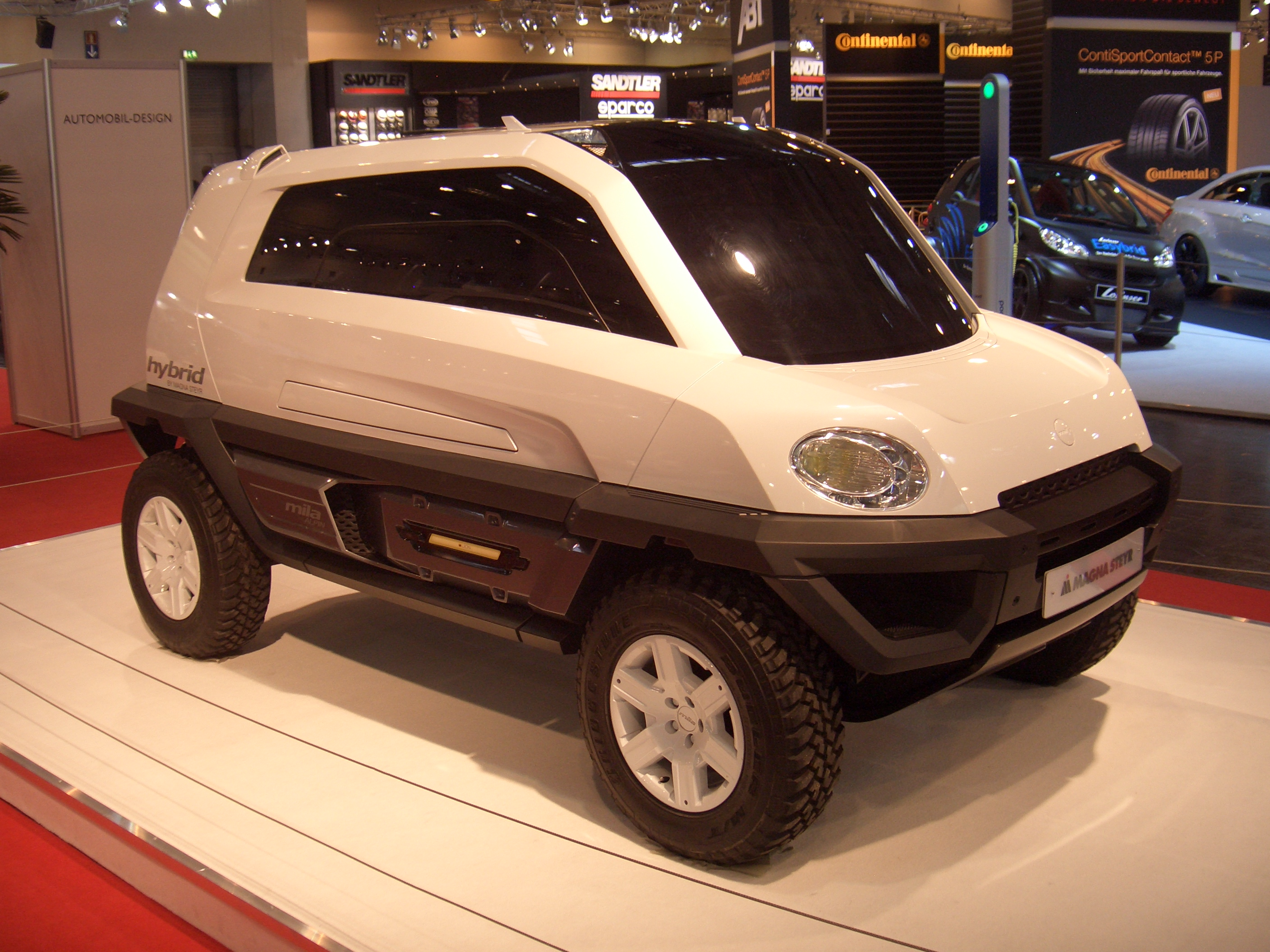
Magna Steyr MILA Alpin concept

The Alpin was a small, lightweight off-road vehicle for four passengers in a 3+1 seat arrangement announced at the 2008 Geneva Motor Show. It had an unusual mid-engine layout and was based on a low-cost production concept. It was 3,540 mm (11.61 ft) long, 1,703 mm (5.587 ft) wide and 1,750 mm (5.74 ft) high, with a 3-cylinder 1.0 L (999 cc) engine in two versions; CNG natural gas or petrol. The petrol version was much lighter, with a weight of 906 kg (1,997 lb).

=== MILA EV ===
The Mila EV was a plug-in electric vehicle concept based on a modular lightweight platform, displayed at the 2009 Geneva Motor Show.

=== MILA Aerolight ===
At the 2011 Geneva Motor Show, the fifth Mila concept car was presented: Mila Aerolight, a compact four-seater, powered by CNG.

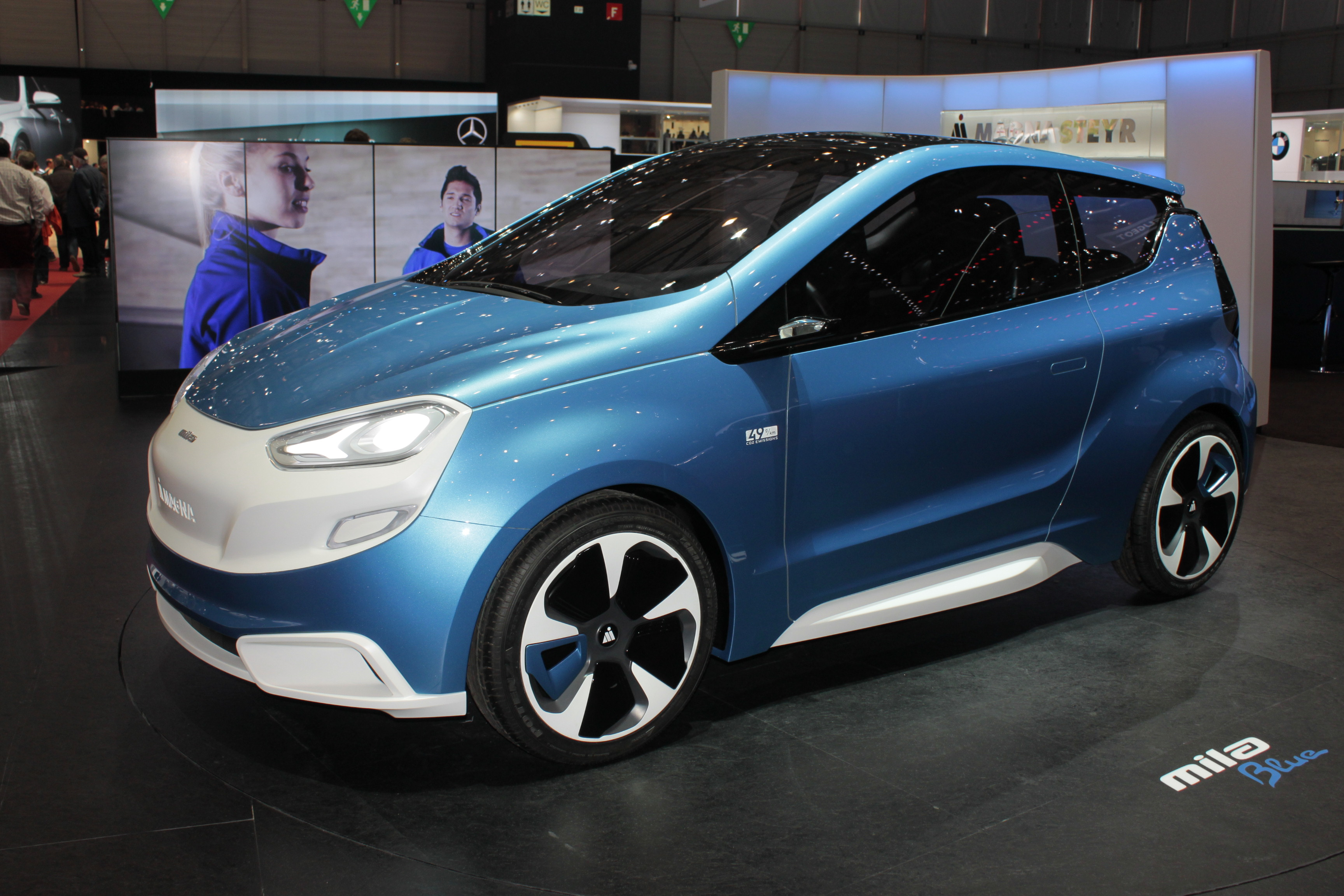
Magna Steyr MILA Blue

=== MILA Coupic ===
The sixth concept car in the Mila family, the Mila Coupic, combines three vehicle concepts in one: a SUV coupé which can be transformed into a pick-up or a convertible. It was presented at the 2012 Geneva Motor Show.

=== MILA Blue ===
The MILA Blue is a natural-gas powered lightweight concept vehicle with emissions of CO_{2} of less than 49 g/km (2.8 oz/mi). The car achieves a weight savings of 300 kg (661 lb) compared to typical current A-segment vehicles powered by CNG.

=== MILA Plus ===
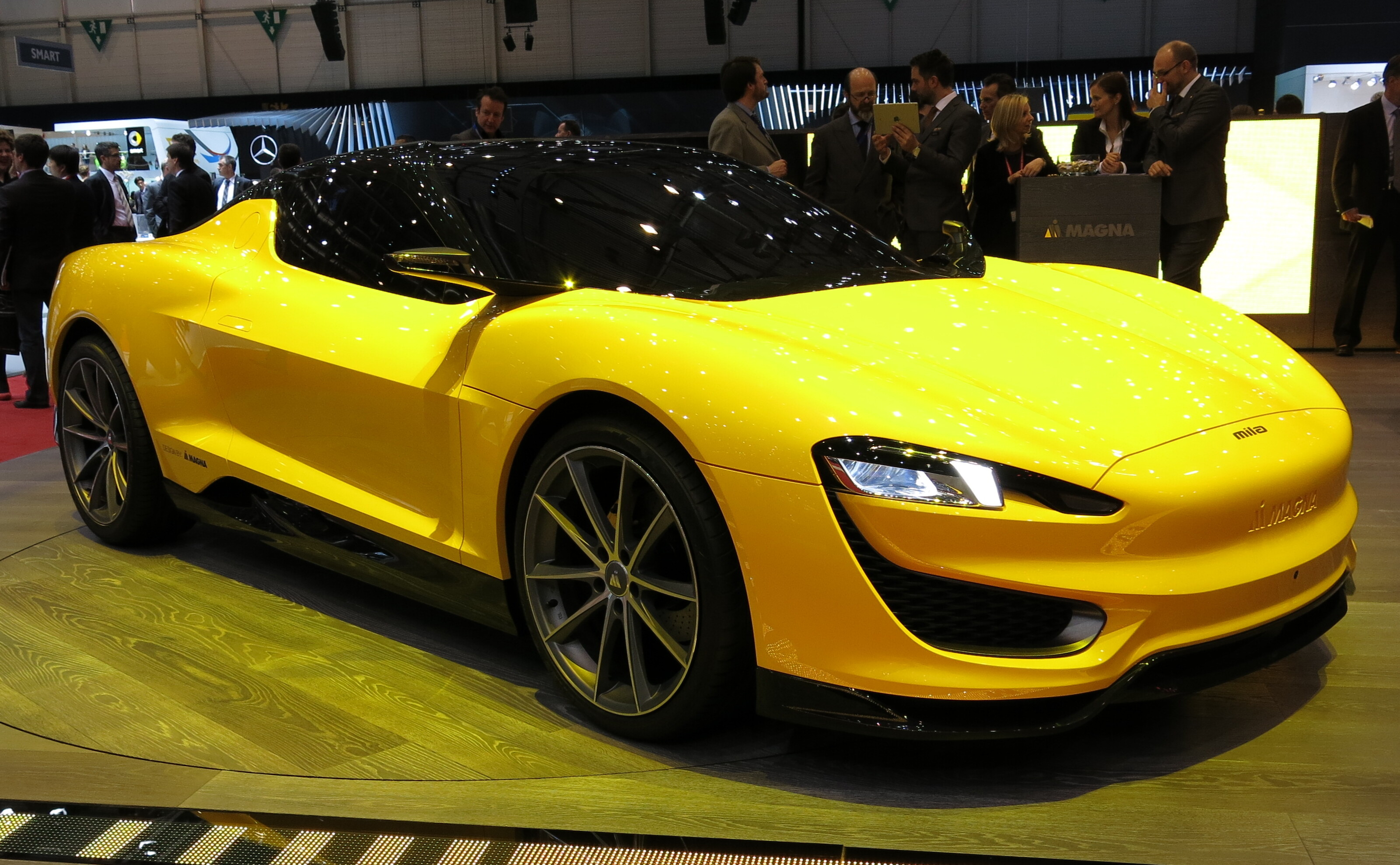
Magna Steyr MILA Plus

The MILA Plus is a plug-in hybrid sports car concept that uses a lightweight aluminum construction and recyclable materials. With an all-electric range of 75 km (47 mi) and a vehicle weight of 1,520 kg (3,351 lb), the MILA Plus achieves CO_{2} emissions of 32 g/km (1.8 oz/mi). It was introduced to the public at the 2015 Geneva Motor Show.

== See also ==
- Karmann in Germany
- Bertone and Pininfarina in Italy
- Heuliez in France
- Valmet Automotive in Finland
