= Fisker Pear =

Electric compact crossover SUV

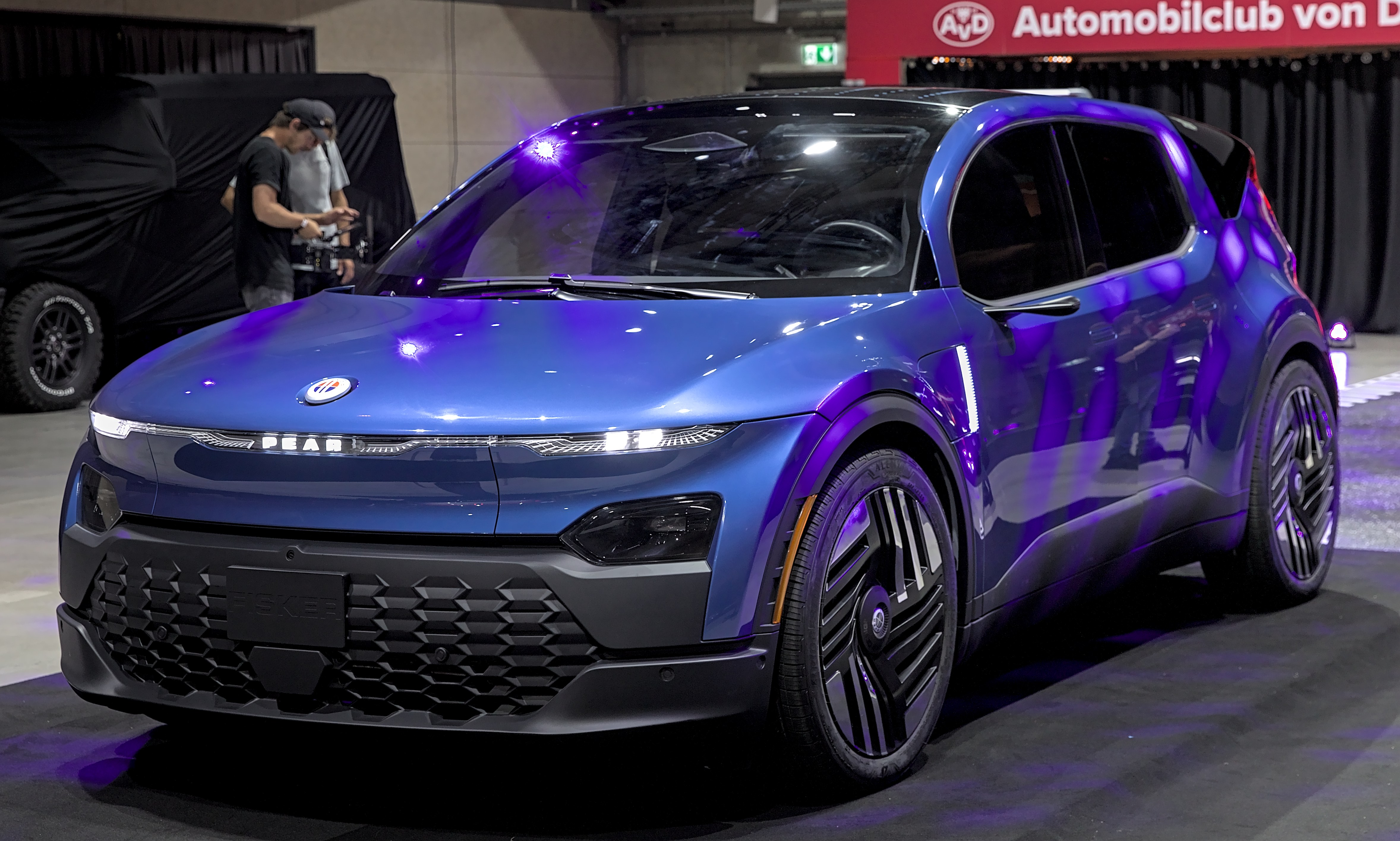

Overview
- Manufacturer: Fisker Inc.
- Production: Cancelled (as of October 2024)
- Assembly: United States: Lordstown, Ohio (Lordstown Assembly)

Body and chassis
- Class: Compact crossover SUV
- Body style: 5-door hatchback

The Fisker Pear is a cancelled battery electric compact crossover SUV concept produced by the American electric vehicle manufacturer Fisker Inc.

== Overview ==
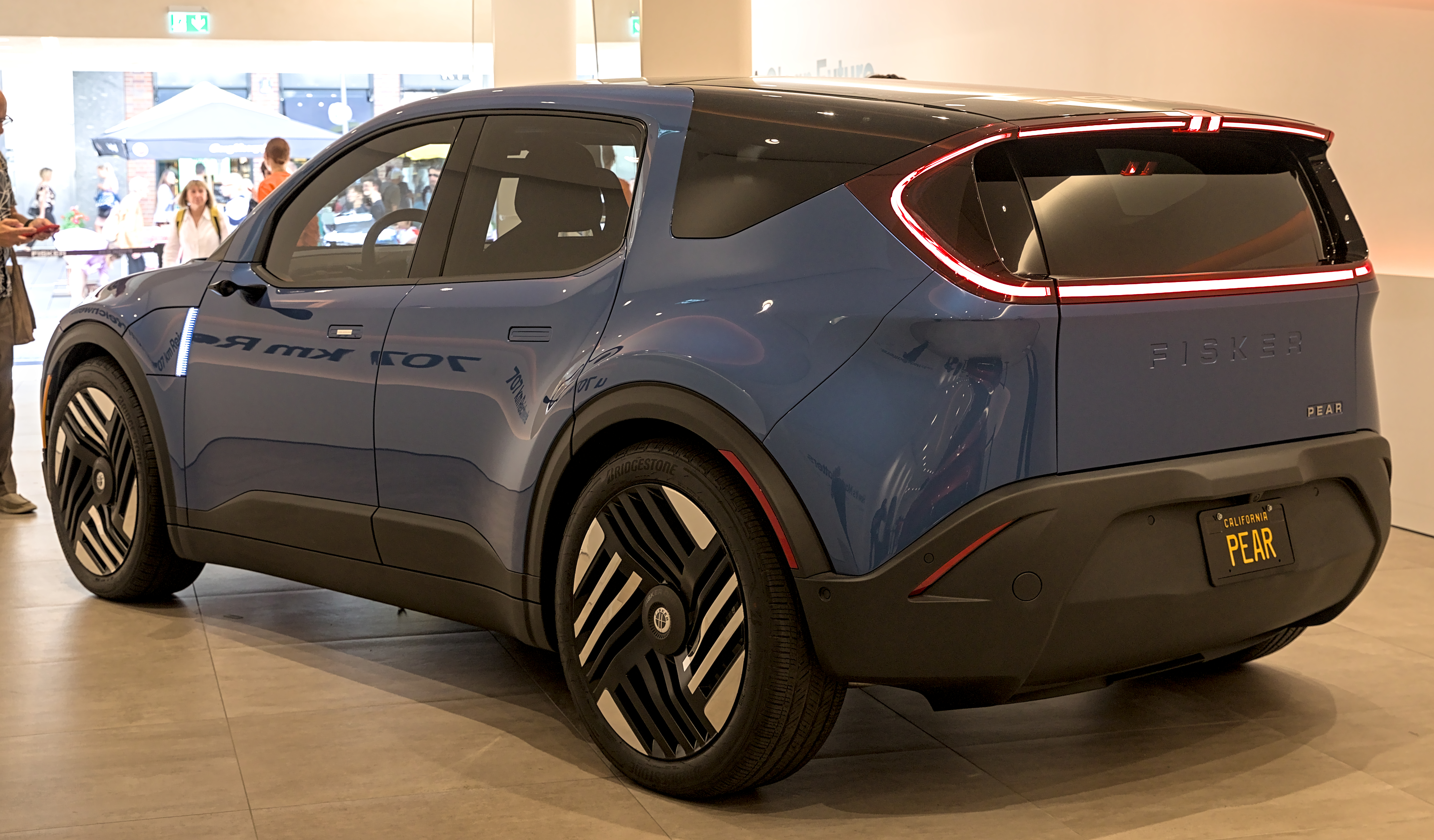
Rear view of the Fisker Pear

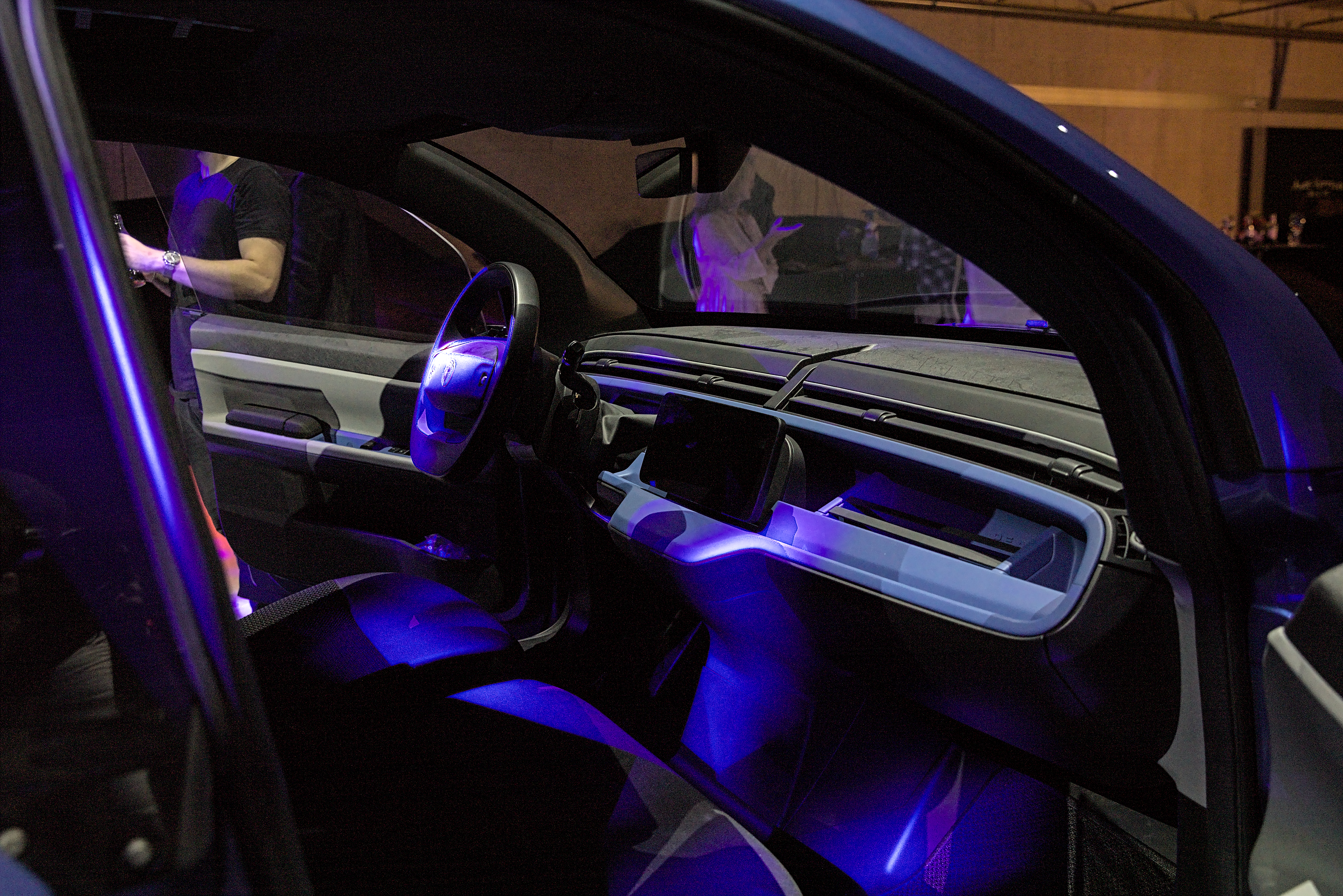
Interior

In February 2022, Fisker Inc. had opened pre-orders for its future electric crossover named Pear (Personal Electric Automotive Revolution). This was the result of a partnership between Fisker and Foxconn. Fisker described the Pear as an "agile urban electric vehicle"; with a length of approximately 4.50 m (14.8 ft), it would have accommodated five people.

The Pear would have been produced at the Lordstown Assembly in Lordstown, Ohio, with a production capacity of 250,000 units per year. According to Fisker, its electric crossover would have been made using recycled materials and components. The production plant, meanwhile, was to be run on only renewable energy. As of May 2022, Fisker was releasing teasers to gradually reveal the exterior design of the Pear. The latter used aesthetic elements inspired by their other vehicle, the Fisker Ocean, especially in the front. The Pear, which was to join the Ocean in the Fisker range, was aimed to be launched in 2025. The price of the vehicle at launch would have been around $30,000.

In March 2024, due to the ongoing financial difficulties Fisker Inc was facing, it was announced that development of the Pear had been paused while the company sought a partnership with a larger car manufacturer in order to secure funds. By October 2024, Fisker filed for bankruptcy, resulting in development of the Pear being permanently cancelled.
