= Fisker Ocean =

Battery electric mid-size crossover SUV

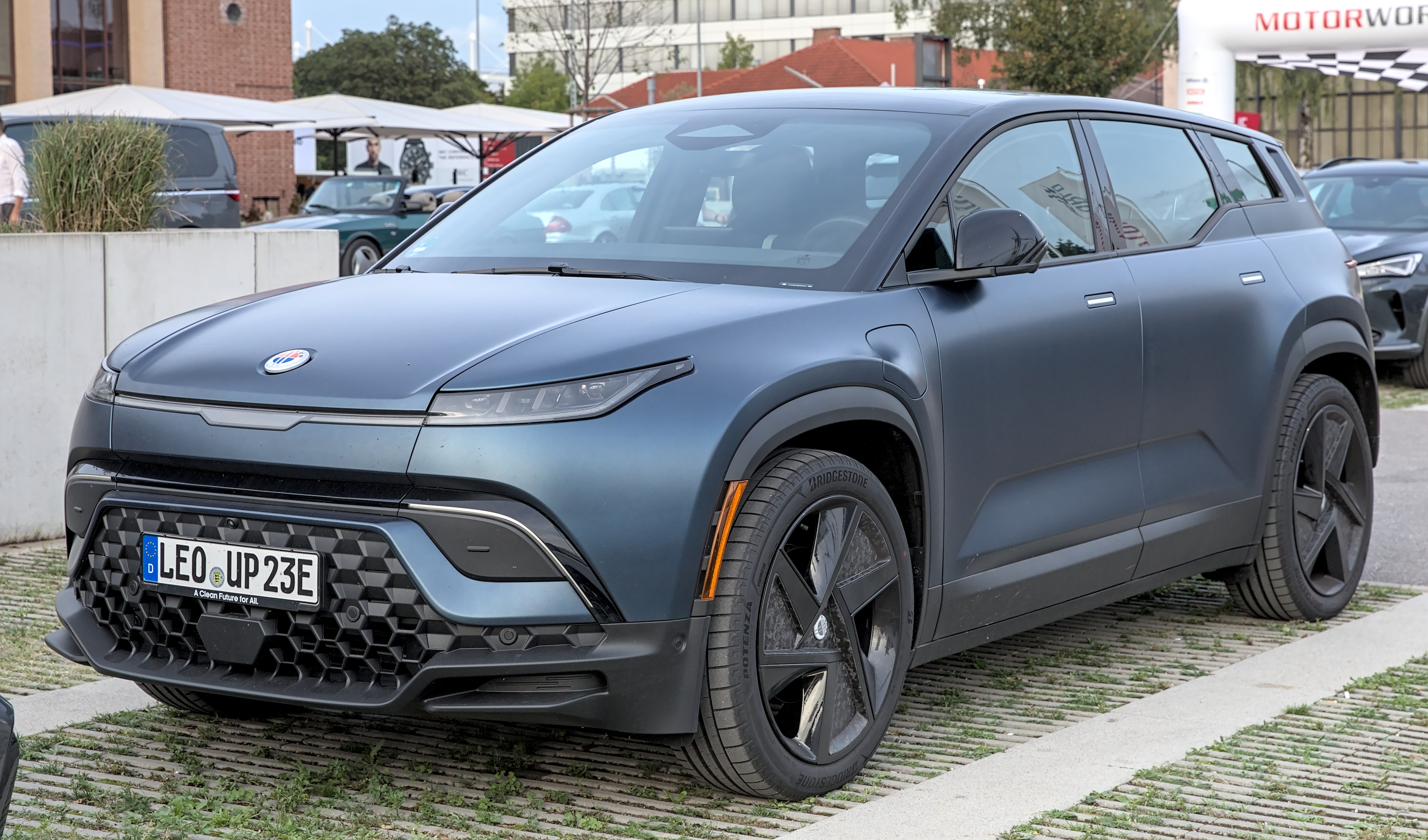

Overview
- Manufacturer: Fisker Inc
- Production: 2022–2024
- Assembly: Austria: Graz (Magna Steyr)
- Designer: Henrik Fisker

Body and chassis
- Class: Mid-size crossover SUV
- Body style: 5-door SUV
- Layout: Dual-motor, all-wheel-drive (One/Extreme/Ultra); Front-motor, front-wheel-drive (Sport)

Powertrain
- Electric motor: 420 kW (570 PS; 560 hp) 2x Permanent-Magnet Synchronous AC Motors (One/Extreme) 205 kW (279 PS; 275 hp) x1 Permanent-Magnet Synchronous AC Motor (Sport)
- Transmission: 1-speed EVT
- Battery: 113.00 kWh (406.8 MJ) Total Capacity; 106.50 kWh (383.4 MJ) Usable lithium-ion battery(One/Extreme/Ultra) 80.00 kWh (288.0 MJ) Total Capacity; 75.00 kWh (270.0 MJ) Usable lithium iron phosphate battery(Sport)
- Electric range: NEDC Cycle 440 mi (708 km) (One/Extreme) 288 mi (463 km) (Sport) EPA Cycle 360 mi (579 km) (One/Extreme) 350 mi (563 km) (Ultra) 231 mi (372 km) (Sport)

Dimensions
- Wheelbase: 115.0 in (2,921 mm)
- Length: 188.0 in (4,774 mm)
- Width: 78.0 in (1,982 mm)
- Height: 64.2 in (1,631 mm) 20" Wheel; 65.1 in (1,654 mm) 22" Wheel
- Curb weight: 2,435–2,509 kg (5,368–5,531 lb)

The Fisker Ocean is a discontinued battery electric mid-size crossover SUV that was manufactured and marketed by Fisker, which filed for bankruptcy protection in June 2024. Released in 2023, the Ocean was intended to be the first of three models in a lineup of mass-market all-electric vehicles designed by Henrik Fisker.

== Overview ==
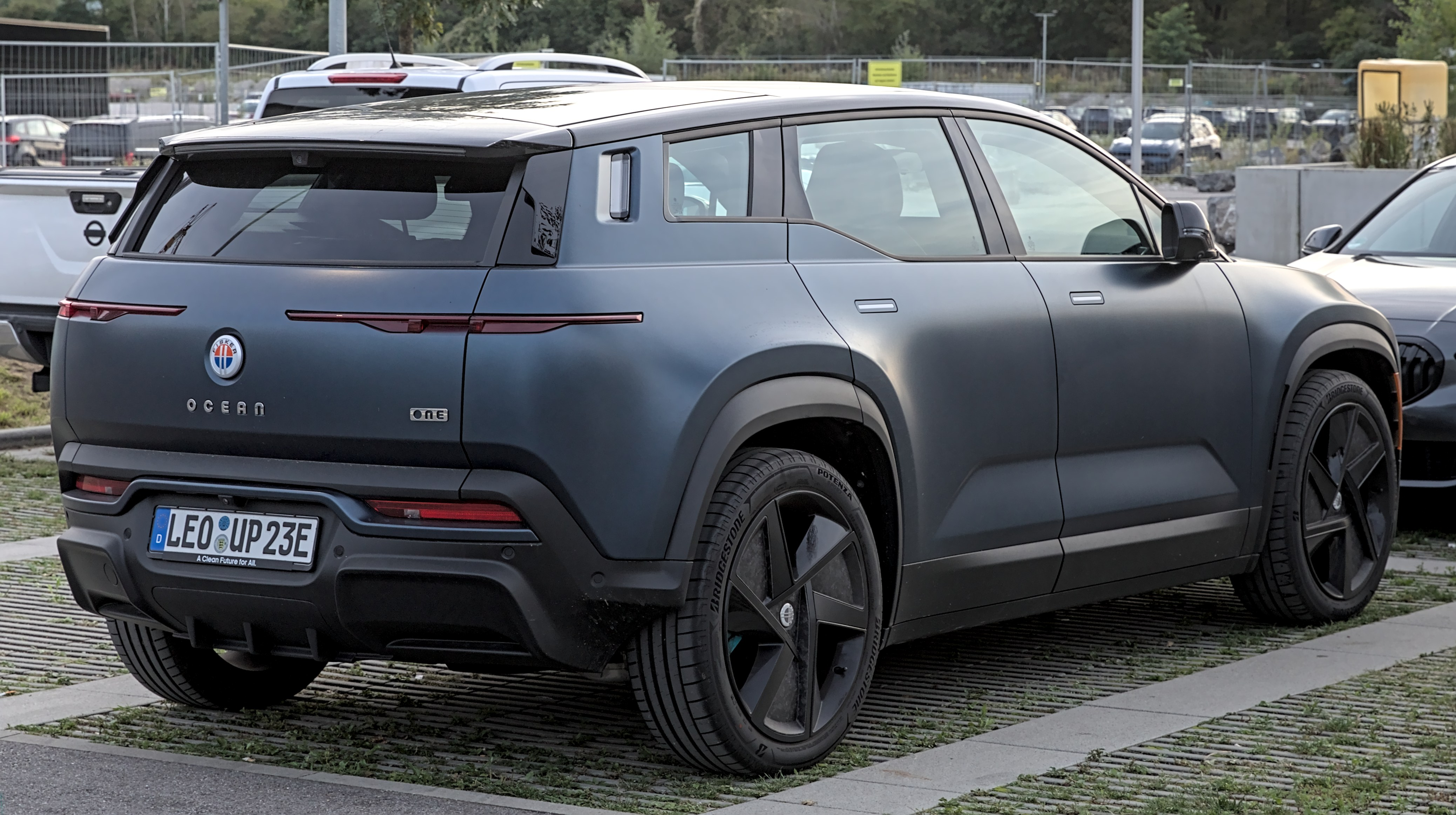
Rear view

On October 15, 2020, Fisker announced it would outsource production of the Ocean to Magna Steyr, a Canadian-owned Austrian contract manufacturer, in order to reduce the complexities and costs related to the building and operating its own factory. Fisker utilised Magna's electric vehicle platform, and gave Magna a stake of up to 6% of Fisker equity. In June 2021, Fisker finalised its manufacturing deal with Magna Steyr, with production on the Fisker Ocean to begin in November 2022 at Magna's facility in Graz, Austria.

In November 2021, Fisker and Contemporary Amperex Technology (CATL) announced a deal for CATL to supply two different battery packs for the Fisker Ocean SUV. The primary high-capacity pack uses a lithium nickel manganese cobalt oxide cell chemistry, and the second pack uses CATL's cells based on lithium iron phosphate chemistry.

The Fisker Ocean was presented at the Mobile World Congress in Barcelona in February 2022.

On June 1, 2023, the Ocean Extreme was reported to achieve an EPA range of 360 miles (579 km). It was offered in both front and all-wheel drive.

The Ocean has experienced more than 100 loss-of-power incidents as well as other technical problems after delivery, resulting in three National Highway Traffic Safety Administration investigations into different issues and multiple recalls.

In March 2024, due to the financial difficulties faced by Fisker Inc, production of the Ocean was paused for six weeks in order for the company to "align inventory levels and progress strategic and financing initiatives.” The company warned that bankruptcy was imminent and could occur within weeks. In June 2024, the company announced it had filed for bankruptcy and was indefinitely suspending production of the Ocean.

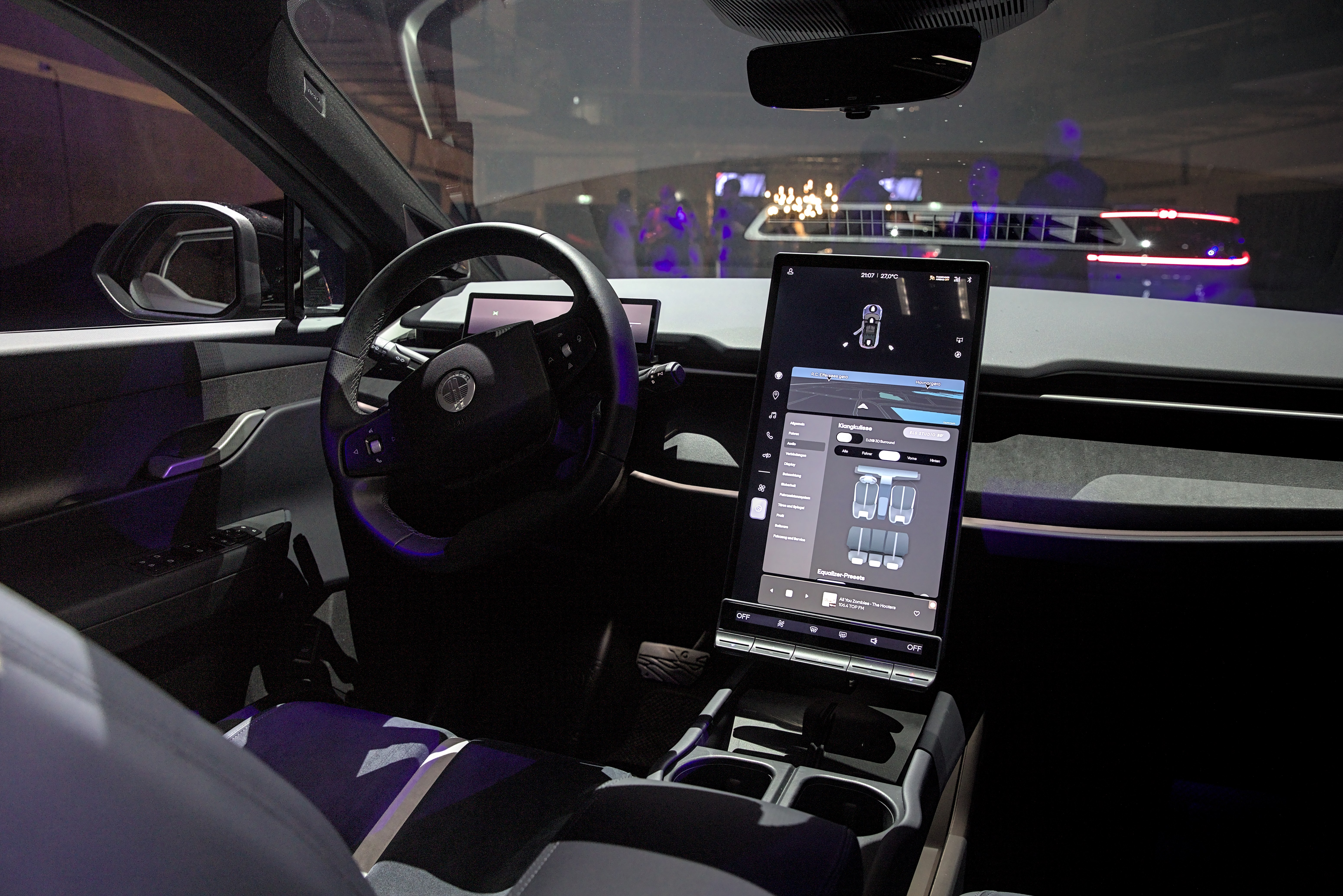
Interior

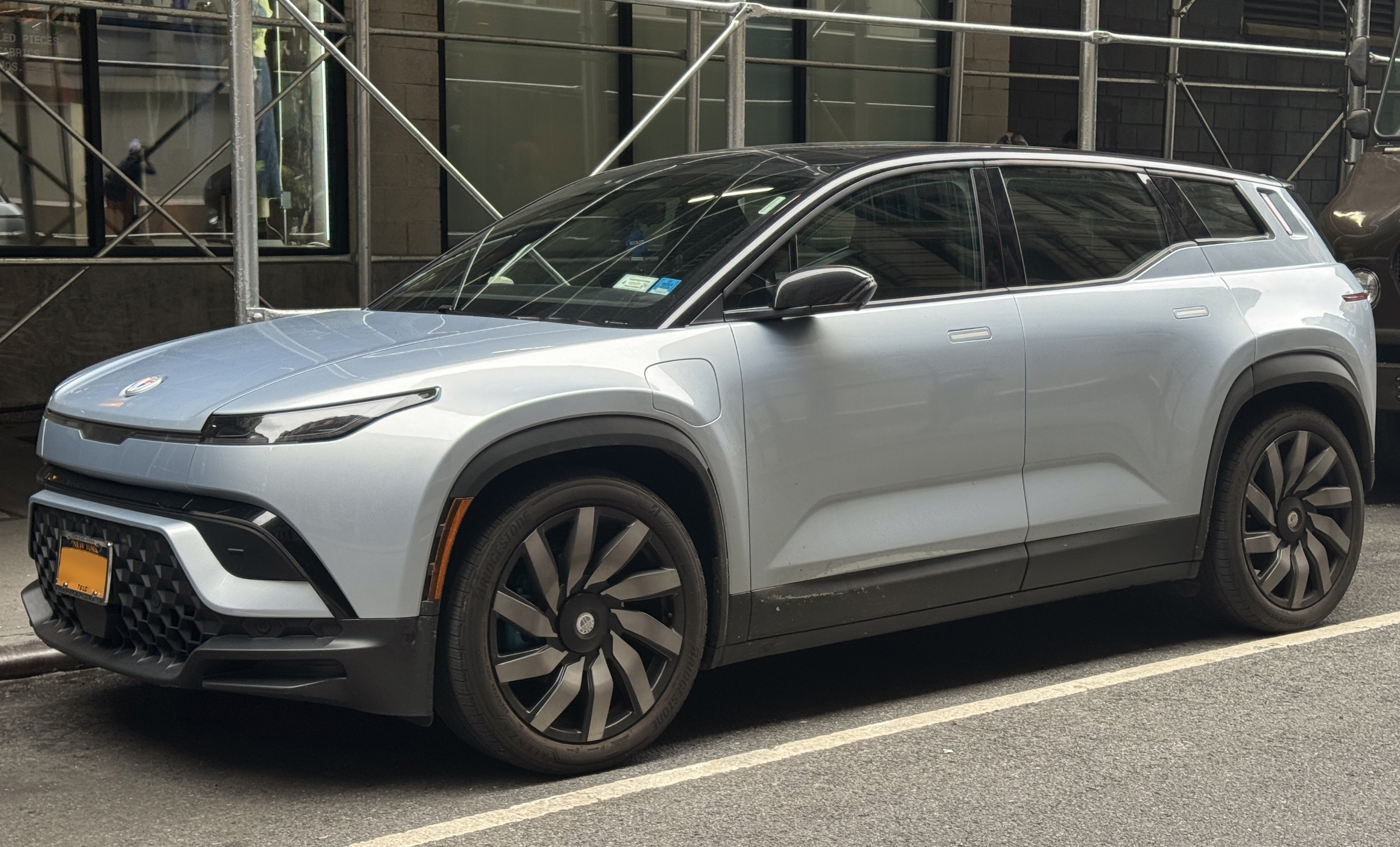
Fisker Ocean from the American Lease fleet, being used as a rideshare car in NYC

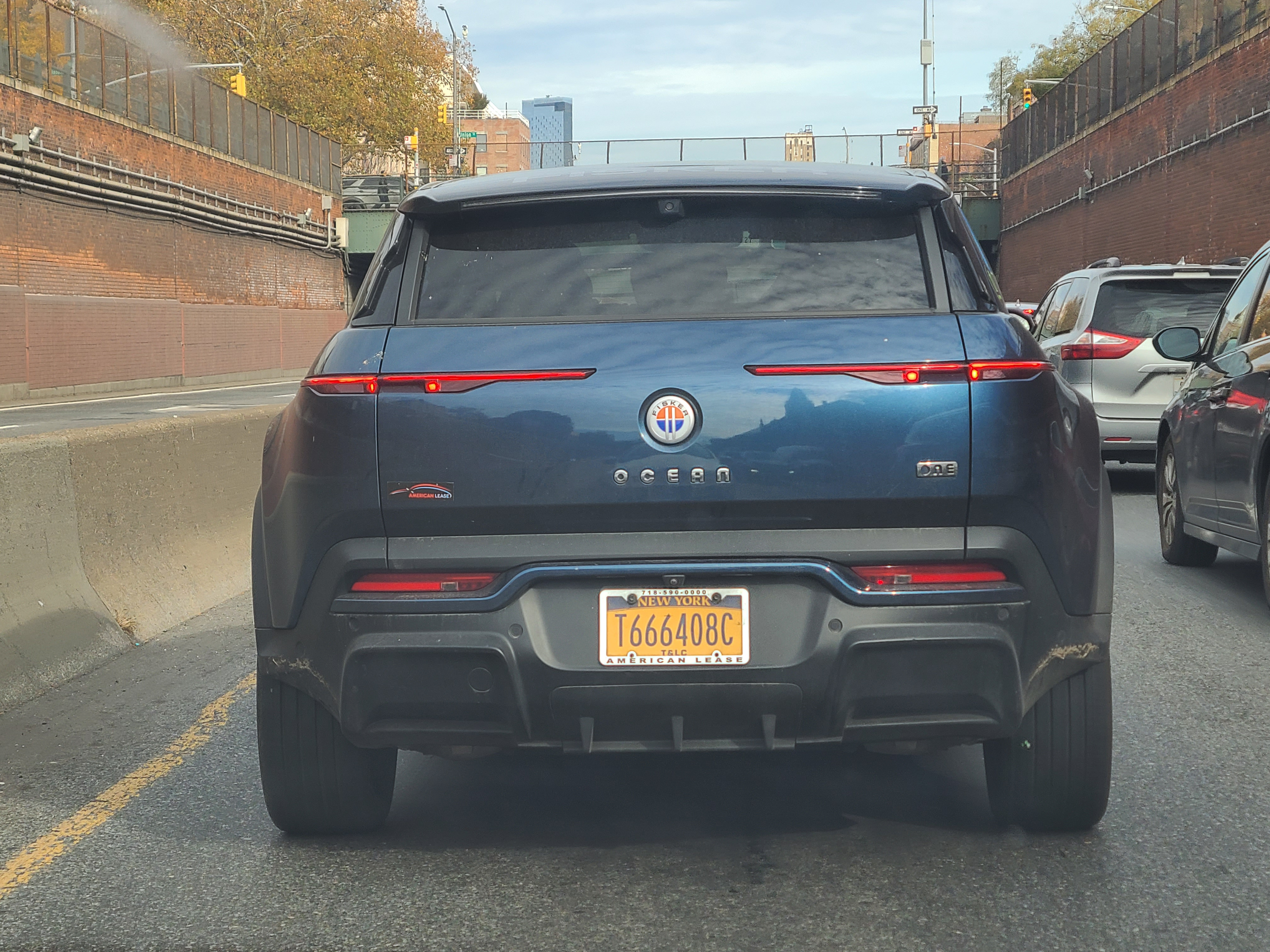
Part of the American Lease fleet in New York City, after the bankruptcy sale

== Pre-orders ==
In October 2020, Viggo, a newly founded Danish ride-hailing service, ordered 300 Fisker Oceans, to be delivered in late 2022. In March 2021, Fisker announced an agreement with Crédit Agricole Consumer Finance (of Crédit Agricole Group) on the potential supply of Fisker Ocean SUVs to the European banking group. In May 2021, Fisker announced an agreement with UK electric car subscription service Onto to supply the company with up to 700 Fisker Ocean SUVs in 2023.

In February 2022, the company announced that it has over 30,000 reservations for the Fisker Ocean SUV and over 55,000 by August 2022. At the end of 2022, the Ocean had 63,000 preorders.

In February 2023, Fisker had over 65,000 reservations. A report showed that more than 40,000 reservations had been cancelled over time due to Fisker's financial struggles and vehicle problems.

== Deliveries ==
Fisker delivered its first Ocean One customer vehicle on May 5, 2023, in Copenhagen, Denmark.

Fisker made its first deliveries to customers in the United States with the delivery of 22 Oceans on June 23, 2023.

Approximately 11,193 were built before production ceased in March 2024, with the majority slowly delivered to customers before Fisker switched to a dealership model. The remaining 3,231 Fisker Oceans were sold to American Lease & Management LLC in a bankruptcy agreement, and their car fleet has been deployed for ridesharing and taxi services in the New York City market.

== Specifications ==
Specifications of the Fisker Ocean
Trim Level	One	Extreme	Ultra	Sport
Powertrain	AWD	AWD	AWD	FWD
Range (EPA)	579 km (360 miles)	579 km (360 miles)	563 km (350 miles)	372 km (231 miles)
Range (WLTP)	708 km (440 miles)	708 km (440 miles)	690 km (429 miles)	463 km (288 miles)
Acceleration 0–62 mph (0–100 km/h)	3.9 seconds W/Boost Mode	3.9 seconds W/Boost Mode	4.2 seconds	7.4 seconds
Top speed	127 mph (205 km/h)	127 mph (205 km/h)	127 mph (205 km/h)	127 mph (205 km/h)
Power (peak)	564 hp (420 kW)	564 hp (420 kW)	544 hp (405 kW)	275 hp (205 kW)
Torque (peak)	737 Nm (543 lb-ft)	737 Nm (543 lb-ft)	737 Nm (543 lb-ft)	386 N⋅m (285 lb⋅ft)
Battery Chemistry	Lithium nickel manganese cobalt oxide	Lithium nickel manganese cobalt oxide	Lithium nickel manganese cobalt oxide	Lithium iron phosphate battery
First Deliveries	May 2023 (Europe); June 2023 (USA)	Late 2023 (Europe/USA)	Late 2023 (Europe/USA)	December 2023 (Europe)
Cargo space	476 L (17 cu ft) Behind Second Row; 918 L (32 cu ft) With Second Row Folded Down			
Charging Port	J1772/CCS1 (North America); Type 2/CCS2 (Europe)			
Charging Speed	175 KW DCFC 7.4 KW AC Onboard Level 2 Charger			
