= Workhorse C-Series =

- Workhorse C^{1000}

Overview
- Manufacturer: Workhorse Group
- Production: 2021
- Assembly: Union City, IN

Body and chassis
- Class: medium-duty truck
- Body style: panel van

Powertrain
- Battery: 35–105 kW-hr NMC
- Electric range: 100 to 150 mi (160 to 240 km)

Dimensions
- Wheelbase: 4,013 mm (158 in) (C^{650}); 4,826 mm (190 in) (C^{1000})
- Length: 6,274 mm (247 in) (C^{650}); 8,230 mm (324 in) (C^{1000})
- Width: 2,184 mm (86 in)
- Height: 3,099 mm (122 in)

The Workhorse C-Series was an American line of battery electric medium-duty delivery vans built by Workhorse Group for commercial package delivery company fleets, which entered limited production in 2021, were recalled that September, and were discontinued in 2022 after fewer than fifty were built. The C-Series was originally named the N-GEN when the line was first announced in 2017. N-GEN prototypes began testing in 2018 and were renamed to the C-Series in 2019.

The C-Series is closely related to the Workhorse W-15 pickup truck; both the W-15 and C-Series are derived from the candidate that Workhorse developed as a joint venture with VT Hackney for the United States Postal Service Next Generation Delivery Vehicle (NGDV) contract competition in 2016. The Workhorse/VT Hackney NGDV candidate in turn used a chassis derived from the AMP Electric/Workhorse E-GEN, which was a plug-in hybrid medium-duty truck chassis announced in 2014, shortly after AMP acquired Workhorse from Navistar.

== History ==
=== E-GEN ===
AMP Electric acquired Workhorse from Navistar in March 2013 for US$5 million and unveiled the E-GEN drivetrain for the Workhorse W-88 Class 5 truck chassis in early 2014; the E-GEN was a plug-in series hybrid that used a 200 kW (270 hp) "Sumo" traction motor/generator provided by tm4 Electrodynamic Systems, drawing from a battery with a gross capacity of 60 kW-hr. A small flex-fuel internal combustion range extender engine from Power Solutions International with 23 kW (31 hp) output could be used when the vehicle was parked to recharge the battery. Estimated battery-only range was 60 mi (97 km); United Parcel Service demonstrated in 2016 that a smaller range extender could be used with improved consumption and no loss of range.

=== USPS NGDV and N-GEN ===
A joint venture between Workhorse (responsible for the chassis and drivetrain, derived from the E-GEN) and VT Hackney (body) was selected in 2016 as one of the finalists competing for the 10-year contract to supply the USPS NGDV, which would provide up to 165,000 vehicles to replace aging and outdated Grumman LLVs and Ford-Utilimaster FFVs that had been used by USPS since 1987. The VT Hackney/Workhorse joint venture delivered their NGDV prototype candidate in September 2017 for testing by the USPS. If awarded the contract, the Workhorse/Hackney NGDV candidate was scheduled tentatively to be built at the former General Motors Lordstown Assembly factory in Lordstown, Ohio.

Shortly after the USPS NGDV candidate was photographed during testing, Workhorse announced it had developed the W-15 pickup truck and N-GEN delivery vehicle for the commercial truck/fleet market; the W-15 and N-GEN are closely related to the NGDV candidate. In a 2020 interview with The Verge, former CEO Steve Burns noted the electric N-GEN and W-15 were derived from the NGDV prototype chassis as a way to recover the investment required to develop the NGDV candidate. Workhorse announced the N-GEN delivery vehicle line in November 2017, stating they would offer it as a battery-electric vehicle with 100 mi (160 km) of range using only the battery. An optional gasoline-powered range extender would increase the range by 75 mi (121 km). Testing of the first N-GEN prototypes commenced in late March 2018 with four examples leased by an unnamed company in the San Francisco Bay Area. Initial production of the larger NGEN-1000 was scheduled to commence in October.

At approximately the same time in February 2018, delivery company UPS announced that it would partner with Workhorse to develop and manufacture a fleet of 50 plug-in electric Class 5 trucks for last-mile delivery. The Workhorse/UPS trucks were based on the larger E-GEN with a cab-forward design. Like the NGDV candidate, W-15, and N-GEN, the UPS/Workhorse E-GEN trucks had a target range of 100 mi (160 km) on electric power. UPS clarified the cost of the proposed electric trucks was comparable to the cost of a conventional truck. In June of that year, UPS increased its order to 1,000, contingent on favorable acceptance testing results for the first 50, which were scheduled to be delivered that September.

DHL ordered 63 N-GEN vans with a nominal 1,000 ft^{3} (28 m^{3}) of cargo volume in February 2019, with planned deliveries to take place later that year. In June 2019, Workhorse obtained US$25 million to continue the N-GEN delivery van project. By November 2019, Workhorse changed the name of the delivery van from N-GEN to C-Series. In November 2019, Workhorse chose battery supplier EnerDel to provide up to 5,200 battery packs for C-Series delivery vans. A prototype of the updated C-1000 (stylized with a superscript as C^{1000}) was shown during a private event at the Transportation Research Center in East Liberty, Ohio. The smaller C^{650} was scheduled to be unveiled at the NTEA 2020 Work Truck Show in March 2020.

In February 2021, the NGDV contract was awarded to Oshkosh Defense. Prior to the award, the per-share price had been driven up by speculators who thought that Workhorse would win the award, which would later lead to an investigation by the Securities and Exchange Commission. Workhorse announced what Bloomberg News described as a "long-shot bid" to overturn the loss of the award. On June 16, 2021, Workhorse filed a formal complaint with the United States Court of Federal Claims protesting the award of the NGDV contract to Oshkosh. However this complaint was dropped in September 2021 after Rick Dauch was selected in July to replace outgoing Workhorse CEO Duane Hughes.

=== Introduction and discontinuation ===
As I've talked to the big customers at UPS, FedEx, others, they expect to have these trucks last 15 to 20 years and go 15 to 20,000 miles a year and carry up to seven or 8,000 pounds of payload. I'm pretty darn sure the C-1000 can't meet those kind of stringent requirements. Okay? That's the bad news. ... Our current C-1000 vehicle design is not robust, nor is it profitable. ... If we can look each other in the eyes, and we can pass every single test, and we can make the modifications on the vehicles we've already built, and we can make those design changes on the next vehicles we build, then yes, we could probably [build 500 more using parts and materials on hand], but we haven't made that decision yet.

— Rick Dauch, Workhorse Group CEO, 2021Q3 earnings call, reported by The Verge in November 2021

The first C-Series van, the Workhorse C-1000, was launched in February 2021 during an event held jointly with the Pritchard Companies in Tampa, Florida. Workhorse completed a limited number of C-1000 electric vans and started shipping them in summer 2021. However, after the initial deliveries, the company announced the truck would be redesigned to increase payload capacity.

In September 2021, Workhorse suspended all deliveries of the vehicle and repurchased all of the 41 vans that had been delivered to customers to-date; the company stated it needed to provide "additional testing and modifications" to comply with the Federal Motor Vehicle Safety Standards (FMVSS) in the United States. Some of the FMVSS that were not met included instrumentation, lighting, tires, and braking, largely attributed to the parts Workhorse had sourced from external suppliers, including tires purchased over the Internet without required markings. In November 2021, Workhorse CEO Rick Dauch admitted during an earnings call that he believed the C-1000 was unreliable.

Workhorse announced in 2022 it will discontinue the C-Series after using up parts on hand to assemble 50–75 more. In March 2022, Workhorse entered an agreement with GreenPower Motor Company to purchase 1,500 EV Star CC vehicles as the basis for Workhorse W750 walk-in vans and W4CC chassis cab, which will be sold in the interim until the company begins production of two new electric commercial vehicle platforms; the W56 is a Class 5/6 truck that will start production in the third quarter of 2023 and the W34 is a Class 3/4 truck scheduled for production in 2024. Both the W56 and W34 are battery electric vehicles; the W56 uses a steel ladder-frame chassis while the W34 will use a low-floor "skateboard" chassis that will form the basis for the next electric Workhorse van.

== Design ==
=== N-GEN ===
The N-GEN prototypes tested in March 2018 weighed 5,500 lb (2,500 kg) and could carry up to 2,000 lb (910 kg) of cargo for up to 100 mi (160 km) of range, drawing from a high-voltage traction battery with 60 kW-hr capacity. It was fitted with the same range extender used in the BMW i3, a 647 cc emergency-use two-cylinder engine built by Kymco for BMW; the range extender added 75 mi (121 km). An optional eight-rotor roof-mounted "HorseFly" drone could carry packages up to 10 lb (4.5 kg). The claimed consumption for the N-GEN was 65 mpg‑e (52 kW⋅h/100 mi). Like the Lordstown Endurance, the N-GEN series was designed with wheel hub motors on the front wheels. An array of sizes was planned, ranging from 250 to 1,000 ft^{3} (7.1 to 28.3 m^{3}) of cargo volume. The N-GEN prototypes were later redesignated NGEN-450, referring to their nominal cargo volume of 450 ft^{3} (13 m^{3}).

The N-GEN project included a planned NGEN-1000 Class 3 truck which had targets of 6,000 lb (2,700 kg) payload and 1,000 ft^{3} (28 m^{3}) of cargo space with a GVWR of 10,001 lb (4,536 kg). The NGEN-1000 was designed to have all-wheel drive with a consumption of 50 mpg‑e (67 kW⋅h/100 mi). Production of the NGEN-1000 was planned to occur in partnership with Prefix Corporation at the Workhorse plant in Union City, Indiana; Workhorse would build the chassis while Prefix would build the composite cab and body.

The N-GEN was equipped initially with a high-voltage lithium-ion traction battery assembled by Workhorse from cylindrical commodity 18650 battery cells supplied by Panasonic.

=== UPS Class 5 E-GEN ===
The E-GEN is a range extended electric vehicle, with a 60 mi (97 km) all-electric range and an additional 60 mi (97 km) from the integrated BMW-supplied gasoline engine. The Class 5 truck prototype for UPS, first shown in May 2018, used the E-GEN chassis and battery pack with a Morgan Olson walk-in body, driven by an electric axle jointly developed by Workhorse and Dana Incorporated. This prototype had a GVWR of 19,500 lb (8,800 kg) and GAWR of 13,500 lb (6,100 kg).

=== C-Series ===
The "C" in the name refers to the vehicle's structural composite body, while the number provides the nominal cargo volume, in cubic feet. The C-1000 was designed with a composite body and frame, reducing unladen weight by 4,000 lb (1,800 kg). The sandwich-structured composite materials used two layers of fiberglass over lightweight cores that included balsa wood and polypropylene; further weight reduction was accomplished by using aluminum where possible. A smaller C-650 was planned for production. Both vans were Class 3 trucks, with a target GVWR of 12,500 lb (5,700 kg) for each.

Unlike most cargo vans, which are equipped with a rear beam axle, the C-Series is equipped with an independent rear suspension using air shocks. The rear suspension uses a trailing-arm design, while the front uses a short/long-arm design with coil springs. The step-in height for the C-Series is 18 cm (7.1 in) and the overall floor height is 30 cm (12 in), eliminating one step.

The initial prototypes had rear-wheel drive using two motors, providing a top speed of 75 mph (121 km/h) with a tested energy consumption of 49 mpg‑e (69 kW⋅h/100 mi). Collective output is 425 hp (317 kW) and 7,500 N⋅m (5,500 lbf⋅ft) of torque, delivered through a 10.5:1 reduction gear to the wheels. Workhorse plan to offer an all-wheel drive variant, driving the front wheels using wheel hub motors.

Equipped with a lithium nickel manganese cobalt oxide battery using pouch cells supplied by EnerDel that has a total capacity of 70 kW-hr and a nominal voltage of 420 V, preliminary testing with a C-1000 prototype showed a 125 mi (201 km) range. The C-1000 could be equipped with two, four, or six battery modules, providing 35, 70, or 105 kW-hr of storage capacity, respectively; the smaller C-650 could be equipped with two or four of the same modules, with corresponding capacities. Range estimates for both the C-1000 and C-650 were 100 to 150 mi (160 to 240 km), depending on the battery configuration. The battery management controller can handle a recharge rate of up to 200 kW (DC), although Workhorse anticipate the C-Series will typically be charged overnight using Level 2 AC charging at 7 kW, with 14 or 22 kW (AC) available as options.
