= 2019 General Motors strike =

Labor strike

- Date: September 15 – October 25, 2019
- Location: 50 different locations around the United States
- Goals: Better compensation, job security
- Methods: Strikes, Demonstrations

Parties
United Auto Workers	General Motors

Number
48,000 UAW members	Unknown

The 2019 General Motors strike began September 15, 2019, with the walkout of 48,000 United Automobile Workers from some 50 plants in the United States. Demands by workers included increased job security, gateway for temporary workers to become permanent, better pay and retaining healthcare benefits.

The strike lasted six weeks, and ended when GM conceded to union demands on wage growth and health care costs because the new contract allows GM to close three factories: the Lordstown Assembly plant, the Baltimore Transmission plant, and the Warren Transmission plant. The new contract includes agreements that "in-progression" workers now get a faster path to top pay: four years from $17 per hour to $28 per hour rather than eight, $75,000–85,000 assistance packages for workers at the three closing plants, and 4% lump sum wage payments in the first and third years with 3% base wage increases in alternating years.

== Background ==
This strike constituted the first major labor action in the American automotive industry in a decade. The last strike coordinated by the UAW targeting General Motors occurred in 2007.

=== Motivations ===
During the Great Recession and economic uncertainty that followed, unionized automotive workers accepted concessions to allow GM and other companies to recover. Though GM has since received large tax breaks and returned to profitability, worker compensation remained stagnant, and the UAW took umbrage with the company's decisions to shutter American facilities and move some jobs abroad.

== Strike ==
The contract between the UAW and General Motors expired September 14, and the strike began at 11:59 p.m. on September 15, 2019. A two-day difference between contract expiration and the beginning of a strike is unusually short, but likely motivated by the prolonged negotiations between management and the union. The strike involved 48,000 GM employees.

On September 17, GM stopped providing health insurance to 55,000 union members, forcing the UAW to pay for COBRA.

On September 26, it was announced that GM would start to pay health insurance again to people on strike.

On October 16, it was announced that GM and the UAW agreed on a new labor contract that ended the month-long strike. However, the agreement between GM and UAW had not been officially approved, and workers who were still on strike said that they would wait until the deal had been ratified before they returned to their jobs. The new contract was ratified by UAW members on October 25, ending the strike. The strike lasted six weeks, and ended when GM conceded to union demands on wage growth and healthcare costs because the new contract allowed GM to close three factories: the Lordstown plant, the Baltimore plant, and a transmission plant in Warren. The new contract includes agreements that "in-progression" workers now get a faster path to top pay: four years to $28 per hour rather than eight, $75,000–85,000 assistance packages for workers at the three closing plants, and 4% lump sum wage payments in the first and third years with 3% base wage increases in alternating years.

== Impact ==
An analyst for Credit Suisse estimated that GM could lose as much as $50 million each day the strike continued, while other analysts estimated daily losses could be as high as $100 million per day. GM's share of the automobile market had decreased from 30% in the late 1990s to 17% by 2019, meaning the strike likely had fewer implications for the economy at large when compared to labor actions in the past. The strike was also predicted to possibly lead to impacts on GM factories abroad, which rely on parts produced in American factories closed because of the strike, and on suppliers such as Canada-based Magna International.

At the beginning of the strike, GM had roughly 83 days' worth of inventory available for sale, temporarily insulating its supply chain from the impact of the strike.

=== Reactions ===
The Teamsters refused to deliver GM cars during the strike, in solidarity with GM workers.

Members of the Trump administration, including Larry Kudlow and Peter Navarro, allegedly intervened in negotiations; however, GM and the White House have both denied Kudlow and Navarro's involvement.

On September 21, Senator Elizabeth Warren, running at the time for the Democratic nomination for President of the United States, joined a UAW picket line in Detroit. Other Democratic contenders for the nomination including Senator Bernie Sanders, former vice-president Joe Biden, Senator Amy Klobuchar, and Representative Tim Ryan, also visited picket lines during the strike.
