= Workhorse W56 =

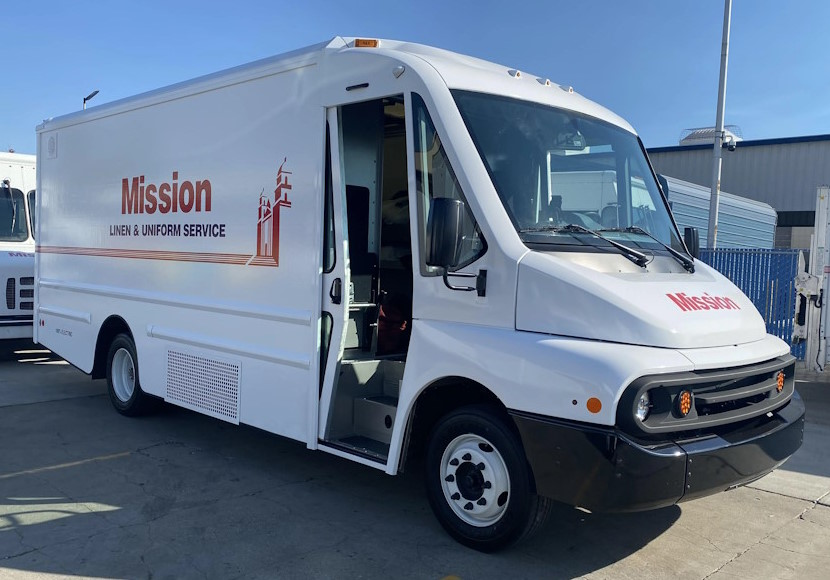

Overview
- Manufacturer: Workhorse Group
- Production: 2023–present
- Model years: 2024–present

Body and chassis
- Body style: Step van
- Layout: RR

Powertrain
- Propulsion: single traction motor
- Battery: 210 kW, 690 V LFP
- Electric range: 150 mi (240 km)
- Plug-in charging: L2: 20 kW (AC); L3: 100 kW (AC/DC)

Dimensions
- Wheelbase: 4,521.2 mm (178 in)
- Length: 8,356.6 mm (329 in)
- Width: 2,438.4 mm (96 in)
- Height: 3,175.0 mm (125 in)
- Curb weight: 5,897 kg (13,000 lb)

Chronology
- Predecessor: Workhorse C-Series

The Workhorse W56 is a line of class 5 and 6 commercial battery electric vehicles designed and built by Workhorse Group starting in 2023, succeeding the firm's earlier C-Series. It is available with a step van body with a nominal 1,000 cu ft (28 m^{3}) of cargo volume, intended for last mile delivery, or as a stripped chassis or chassis cab configuration intended for completion by coachbuilders with custom bodies.

== History ==
In 2022, after recalling all 41 C-1000 commercial vans that were completed in 2021, Workhorse announced they would pause nearly all manufacturing activities for the first half of the year while they continued to develop a replacement, the W56. The W56 was unveiled at the NTEA Work Truck Show in March 2023. Production of the W56 began in September 2023.

== Design ==
The driven beam axle is provided by Linamar-McLaren, which brands it the eAxle system, claimed to have superior performance and efficiency. It has a 690 V motor.

A prototype truck exhibited at ACT Expo in May 2023 was equipped with a 210 kW-hr lithium iron phosphate battery. The estimated efficiency is 26.4–30.8 mpg‑e (128–109 kW⋅h/100 mi), and the estimated range is 150 mi (240 km).

The curb weight of the step van prototype is 13,000 lb (5,900 kg) with the standard battery, offering a maximum estimated cargo capacity of 10,000 lb (4,500 kg), given a GVWR of 23,000 lb (10,000 kg). The cargo box measures 209 in (5,300 mm) long, 90 in (2,300 mm) wide, and 86 in (2,200 mm) high, yielding a volume of 940 cu ft (27 m^{3}). To save weight, body panels are made of foam core board with a layer of thermoplastic bonded to each side, supported by an aluminum frame. The frame uses cross-members that have a cylindrical cross-section for traction battery protection, which also improves torsional rigidity.

Alternative styles are planned to be available, including a stripped chassis and chassis cab. There will be three models: 158, 178, and 208, apparently referring to the length of the wheelbase, in inches.

== Sales ==
The first fleet order for the W56 was placed by Mission Linen Supply for 15 trucks, in December 2023; a second fleet order of 15 trucks was placed through the same dealer in January 2024 to an undisclosed client. Delivery of both orders is scheduled to be complete in 2024.
