= Nu Ride Inc. =

American electric vehicle manufacturer

- Formerly: Lordstown Motors Corporation
- Type: Public
- Traded as: OTCID Basic: NRDE; Nasdaq: RIDE (2020–23)
- ISIN: US54405Q1004
- Industry: Automotive
- Founded: 2018; 8 years ago
- Founder: Steve Burns
- Headquarters: New York, New York, United States
- Key people: William Gallagher (CEO)
- Revenue: US$0 (Fiscal Year Ended 31 December 2020)
- Website: investor.lordstownmotors.com

Nu Ride Inc., formerly Lordstown Motors Corporation, is an American electric vehicle automaker located in Lordstown, Ohio. The company was based at the Lordstown Assembly plant, previously a General Motors factory. Lordstown Motors was known for its Lordstown Endurance electric pickup truck. In March 2024, the company emerged from its September 2023 bankruptcy restructuring as Nu Ride Inc., headquartered in New York City.

== Lordstown Motors ==
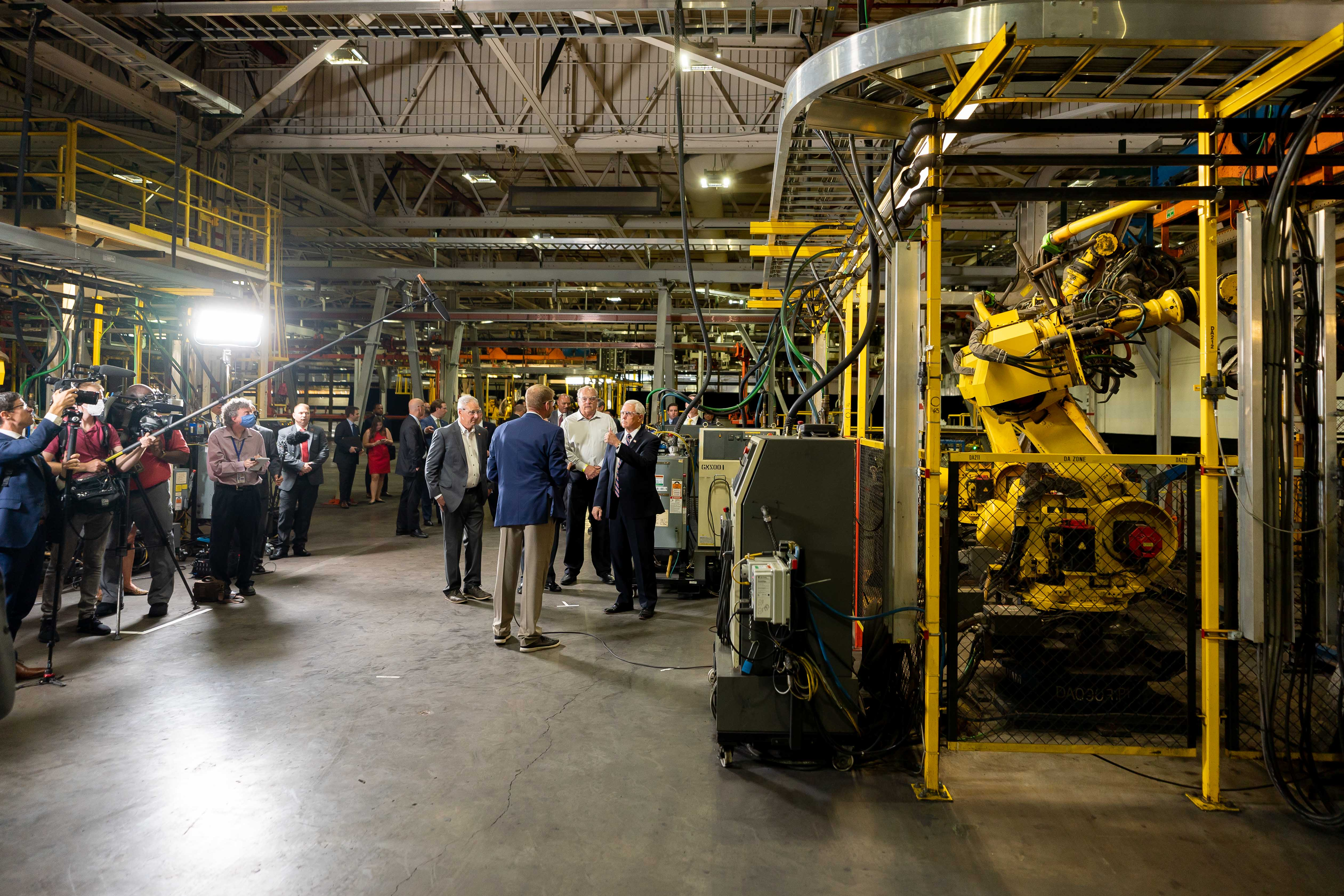
The Lordstown Plant on June 25, 2020, during a visit from Vice President Mike Pence

Lordstown Motors was founded in 2018 by Steve Burns, former CEO of Workhorse Group. On November 7, 2019, Lordstown Motors became the owner of the former GM Lordstown plant, after signing a sales agreement with automaker General Motors in May 2019. GM loaned Lordstown Motors US$40 million to underwrite a substantial part of the plant purchase.

In March 2020, Lordstown Motors paid Workhorse Group US$12 million for the licensing rights to the intellectual property of the Workhorse W-15 pickup truck, intending to develop its electric pickup truck based upon Workhorse's preexisting design. As part of the business deal, Workhorse Group was given a 10% equity stake in Lordstown Motors.

On October 23, 2020, Lordstown reverse merged with a special-purpose acquisition company (SPAC) named DiamondPeak Holdings and became listed on the NASDAQ stock exchange. The merger gave Lordstown Motors an estimated equity value of US$1.6 billion. On the same day, GM released Lordstown Motors from its mortgage obligations related to the purchase of the Lordstown factory.

In January 2021, the company announced the opening of a vehicle service center in Irvine, California, to support customers in the Southern California region. It is Lordstown's first service center outside of Ohio, with California chosen due to "the favorable regulatory backdrop in the state, which is aggressively promoting more widespread adoption of electric vehicles", according to the company.

In March 2021, the investment research firm Hindenburg Research, which specialized in financial investigation reports on target companies, published a lengthy report about Lordstown. In the report, Hindenburg presented evidence that demonstrated a history of fraud at Lordstown, with the company misleading investors by exaggerating demand and orders for its trucks, as well as Lordstown's ability to build these trucks. Hindenburg's report showed that thousands of Lordstown's claimed orders were non-binding, no-deposit indications of interest by companies without the apparent financial strength to support the size of the orders. The report also claimed significant production delays beyond Lordstown's claimed timeline with trucks three to four years away from production, stock sales by insiders amidst vehicle testing problems, and irregularities in the background of Lordstown's founder, Steve Burns. Lordstown's stock dropped 17% on the day of the news. The company responded with a statement saying, "We will be sharing a full and thorough statement in the coming days, and when we do we will absolutely be refuting the Hindenburg Research report." The Hindenburg Research report led to the US Securities and Exchange Commission (SEC) requesting information from Lordstown Motors regarding the short-seller's claims of misleading investors.

It was also revealed in March 2021 that one of Lordstown's prototypes caught on fire, with the company claiming the fire was caused by "human error" and that the issue had been solved by Lordstown instead automating the manufacture of its vehicles.

On June 8, 2021, Lordstown Motors amended its annual report with the SEC and said that the company did not have enough money to begin commercial production of its vehicle and that Lordstown Motors was at risk of bankruptcy. Subsequently, both CEO Steve Burns and CFO Julio Rodriguez resigned from their positions on June 14. While the official press release stated that the resignations were in anticipation of changing from research and development to production, the non-binding nature of pre-sale agreements was brought into question after revelations that the largest three purchasers were not committed to acquiring Lordstown production vehicles, and most did not have the means to do so. An independent investigation commissioned by the board found that the pre-order agreements were overstated in number and seriousness to generate press.

In August 2021, veteran automobile executive Daniel Ninivaggi, former CEO of Icahn Enterprises, was named as the new CEO.

In October 2021, Lordstown Motors announced a US$230 million deal to sell the former GM plant to Foxconn Technology Group, which would become a contract assembler for the company's Endurance pickup truck. It was announced that Foxconn would also invest US$50 million in the company through a purchase of common stock.

The Foxconn deal was finalized in May 2022, and Foxconn and Lordstown Motors created a new joint venture, MIH EV Design LLC, to develop and produce a line of EVs. In addition to selling the factory to Foxconn, Foxconn was to become the contract manufacturer for Lordstown Motors' first vehicle, the all-electric Endurance pickup truck. Foxconn's plan was to use the factory as the production hub for the proposed Fisker PEAR electric vehicle.

GM decided to end its relationship with Lordstown. Back in 2020, they had invested US$75 million in Lordstown Motors, obtained a seat on Lordstown Motors' board of directors, and listed Lordstown Motors in its Tier 1 supply chain. Despite that, GM released public information in March 2022 that they had sold off their "small investment" in Lordstown Motors at the end of 2021.

In July 2022, automotive industry veteran Edward Hightower was named the new CEO. In November 2022, Foxconn agreed to invest another US$170 million in Lordstown, in an effort to ramp up the production of the company's debut model.

=== Bankruptcy ===
On June 27, 2023, Lordstown sued Foxconn for failing to follow through with its $170 million investment and subsequently filed for Chapter 11 bankruptcy protection as part of a plan to sell itself.

On September 27, 2023, in a bankruptcy filing, Lordstown agreed to sell assets related to the "design, production and sale of electric light duty vehicles" in the commercial fleet market to Delaware-based LAS Capital, whose majority equity holder is Lordstown founder and ex-CEO Steve Burns, for $10M. On October 18, 2023, the sale was approved by the bankruptcy court, which also, after objections from the United States Justice Department, kept control of rights to pursue legal claims against Lordstown's directors with the court instead of following the new owners of the assets. The sale includes all vehicles, machinery, books, records, information, files, and data and plans owned by Lordstown and the new owner will assume liability for all customer warranty, product liability, and recall obligations related to Lordstown Endurance trucks.

=== Vehicles ===
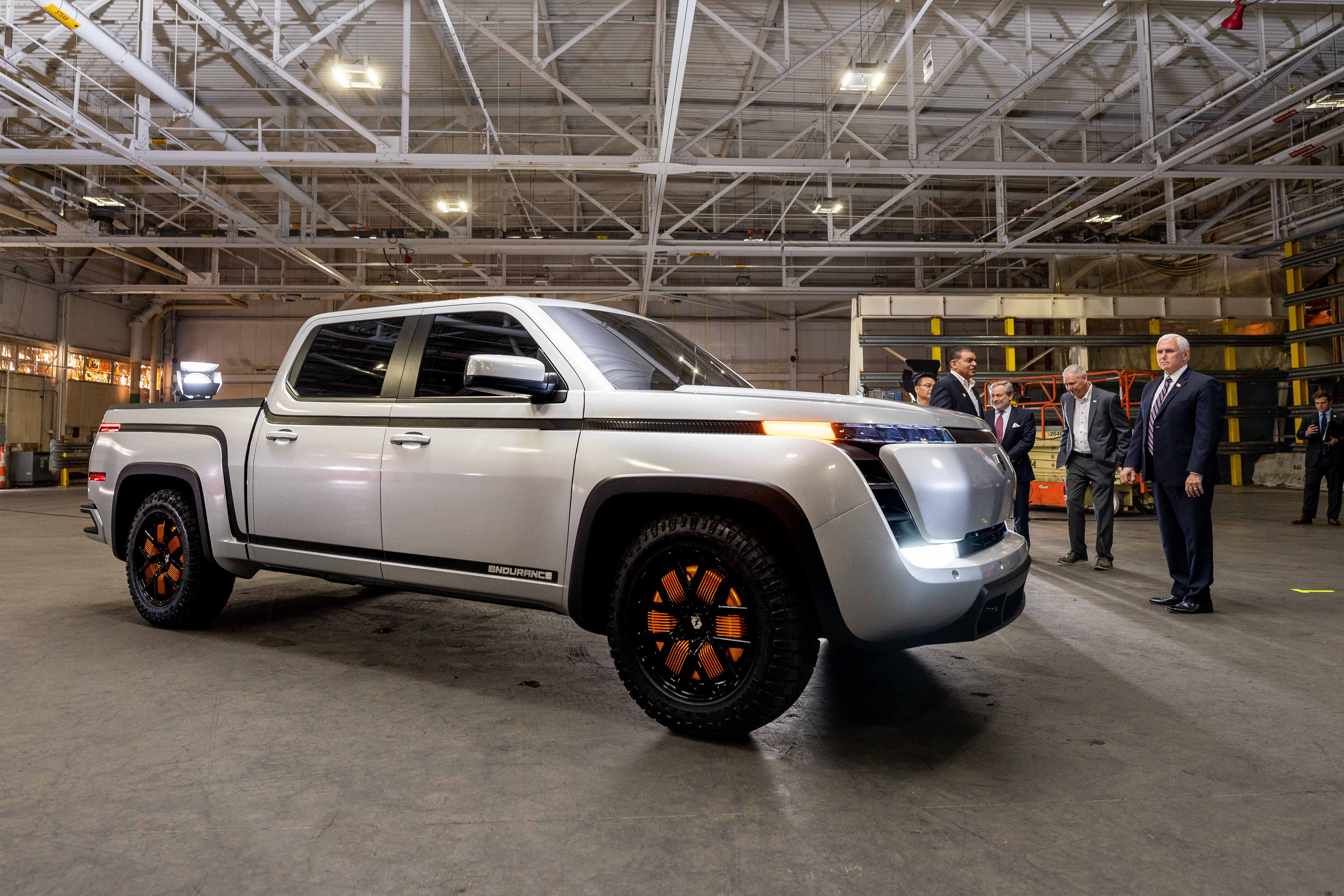
Prototype Lordstown Endurance electric pickup truck

The Lordstown Endurance was an in-production all-wheel-drive (AWD), electric pickup truck. Its design includes independent wheel hub motors on all four wheels. The AWD hub motor system aims to reduce the number of moving parts by eschewing wheel axles and transmissions. In 2019, the truck was expected to be released in the US market by late 2020, at a price of US$52,500. In November 2020, the release date was delayed, pushing the first deliveries back to September 2021, with production ramping up through 2022.

By October 2021, the announced production date for the Endurance had been delayed until no earlier than April 2022, following the September news that the Lordstown auto plant would be sold to Foxconn and that Foxconn would become the contract manufacturer of the Endurance.

In October 2021, Foxconn unveiled three new prototype vehicles: the Model C SUV scheduled to go on sale in 2023 in Taiwan, an electric bus that was planned to be tested in select cities in 2022, and a new electric sedan.

On August 4, 2022, the company admitted to further production delays for the Endurance, citing they would need to raise "substantially more capital" to produce the initial goal of 500 vehicles.

Lordstown Motors launched production of its Endurance pickup truck in the third quarter of 2022. In February 2023, the company issued a recall and halted production of the vehicle to address an electrical-connection issue that could lead to a loss of propulsion while driving.

In June 2023, Lordstown Motors would end the production of the Endurance and sold the project in September 2023, following their dispute with partner Foxconn and filing for Chapter 11 Bankruptcy.

== See also ==
- Lordstown Assembly
- Workhorse Group
