= Active Wheel =

Active Wheel was a Michelin-developed tire which incorporates an electric motor and suspension It was presented at Challenge Bibendum 2004's edition on the Hy-Light concept car and showcased during Paris Motor Show "Mondial de l'automobile"in 2008 both on the Venturi Volage electric sports car and on the Heuliez Will. The project was interrupted in 2014.

Like other in-wheel motors, the ActiveWheel design provides direct power delivery of approximately 30 kW (40 hp), as well as regenerative braking. In addition, it replaces a mechanical suspension with an active suspension driven by an in-wheel electrical suspension motor that controls torque distribution, traction, turning maneuvers, pitch, roll and suspension damping for that wheel. However, the effects of shocks, water and snow to such an "in-wheel" design have not been precisely studied.

Siemens VDO, developing a similar concept called eCorner, was purchased by Continental in 2007.
