= Lordstown Endurance =

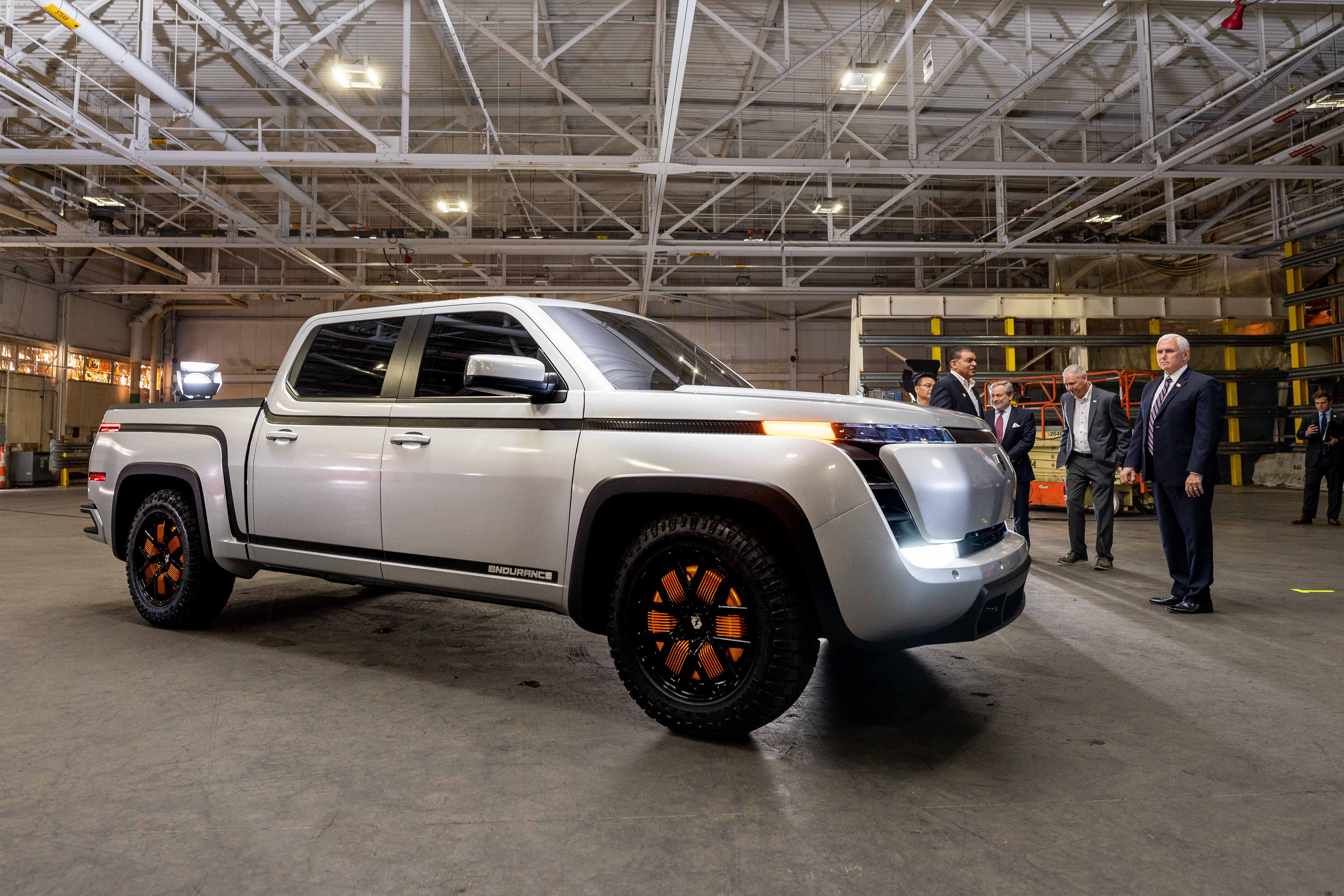
- Prototype Lordstown Endurance on display during a factory visit by then Vice President Mike Pence

Overview
- Manufacturer: Lordstown Motors
- Production: September 2022–June 2023
- Model years: 2023
- Assembly: United States: Lordstown, Ohio (Lordstown Assembly)
- Designer: Mike Desmond of Hydra Design Labs (exterior); Chris Schuttera (interior)

Body and chassis
- Class: Electric full-size pickup truck
- Body style: 4-door pickup truck
- Layout: Wheel hub motors, individual-wheel drive

Powertrain
- Electric motor: 4 wheel hub AC permanent magnet electric motors
- Battery: 109 kWh
- Range: 174 mi (280 km) EPA

Dimensions
- Wheelbase: 146.2 in (3,713 mm)
- Length: 230.0 in (5,842 mm)
- Width: 81.4 in (2,068 mm)
- Height: 76.4 in (1,941 mm)
- Curb weight: 6,450 lb (2,930 kg)

The Lordstown Endurance is a battery electric full-size pickup truck with wheel hub motors manufactured by Lordstown Motors in collaboration with Foxconn at its Ohio factory. The Endurance entered limited production in September 2022 with plans to manufacture no more than 500 vehicles through June 2023. It was the company's first production automobile.

== History ==
=== Initial design ===
Development began as the range-extended electric vehicle Workhorse W-15 in 2016. The automotive press got their first look at the W-15 at a May 2017 event held in Long Beach, California. A prototype W-15 was shown in August 2018, fitted with a gasoline range extender sourced from BMW. Steve Burns, the CEO of Workhorse Group, left that company to help found the automotive startup Lordstown Motors in autumn 2019. The W-15 design was licensed in November 2019 to Lordstown in exchange for a 10% minority stake in the latter company, and Workhorse paused further development of the W-15. Simultaneously, Lordstown acquired the Lordstown Assembly plant from General Motors.

In the second half of December 2019, Lordstown Motors presented the first preliminary information about its vehicle. The electric pickup truck design was renamed to the Lordstown Endurance, adopting an avant-garde design that combines the classic proportions of a semi-truck with lighting that forms a single line with embossing. The W-15 forms the basis of the Endurance, although there are significant differences.

In mid-June 2020, Lordstown presented the first official sketches showing the appearance of the passenger cab of the Endurance, while the world premiere of the pickup took place on June 25 of the same year.

=== Testing and factory sale ===
A prototype Endurance caught fire 10 minutes into its first test drive in January 2021 and was completely destroyed. Details of the fire were not released publicly until February 2021; Hindenburg Research, a short-seller of Lordstown stock, published a report in March alleging that Lordstown had inflated preorder numbers to boost investor confidence and provided further details about the fire gleaned from a police report.

In June 2021, company officials said they planned to begin production in fall 2021, even though the company had no firm orders for the truck, as they had sufficient capital to produce into 2022. Also in June, Lordstown CEO Steve Burns and CFO Julio Rodriguez resigned as a result of an investigation into preorders sparked by Hindenburg's report. The company warned that it had experienced difficulty securing sufficient funding to begin full production, and stated that the US$587 million it reported in its latest quarterly SEC filing would not be enough to get to "full commercial production." In August of that year, Workhorse divested most of its share in Lordstown.

In September 2021, Lordstown announced the factory would be sold to Foxconn for $230 million, plus an additional $50 million investment into Lordstown, to raise the capital needed to start production; Lordstown would enter a contract with Foxconn to manufacture the Endurance. The first vehicles were unveiled in an October 2021 event held jointly by Foxconn and Lordstown. The factory sale to Foxconn closed in May 2022.

=== Production ===
Production of the Endurance took place at Lordstown Assembly, a former General Motors plant, in the village of the same name in the U.S. state of Ohio; Lordstown Motors had purchased the shuttered plant from GM in November 2019 and owned it until it was sold to Foxconn in 2021.

Originally, production was to start in 2020, but due to the COVID-19 pandemic in Ohio, it was postponed to 2021, and in June 2021, this was pushed back to fall 2021 following revelations about a lack of confirmed orders. Production was delayed again in October 2021 to April 2022 after Lordstown announced it was selling the factory to Foxconn. A month later, Lordstown announced that production would be delayed to the third quarter of 2022 due to supply chain issues. Commercial production began on September 29, 2022; Lordstown expected to produce 50 Endurance vehicles in 2022 and up to 450 more in the first half of 2023.

By November 2022, Lordstown said it had assembled 500 Endurance trucks, and after winning type approval, would begin deliveries before the end of the year. Lordstown delivered three Endurance trucks to customers in the fourth quarter of 2022. By February 2023, Lordstown had assembled only 31 Endurance trucks since production began in September 2022; the factory was shut down after issuing a recall for 19 of those for a "specific electrical connection issue that could result in a loss of propulsion while driving". As of March 2023, sources suggest that six trucks have been delivered to customers in total. A second and third recall followed in March and April 2023, respectively.

On June 27, 2023, Lordstown Motors announced that they would sell the Endurance following the company filing for Chapter 11 bankruptcy after a dispute between its parent company FoxConn, marking the end of the Lordstown Endurance.

== Design ==
=== Workhorse W-15 ===
The W-15 had an all-wheel drive powertrain driven by two traction motors, one each for the front and rear axles, with a combined output of 460 hp (340 kW). These motors drew from a battery carried between the frame rails consisting of 6,000 cells from Panasonic; gross capacity was 60 kW-hr, but the useable capacity was limited to 40 kW-hr for longevity. The all-electric range was estimated to be 80 to 100 mi (130 to 160 km). There was an onboard 11 US gal (42 L) gasoline tank and three-cylinder range extender that added an additional 310 mi (500 km); the 0.7 L I-3 had an estimated output of 38 hp (28 kW) and 41 lb⋅ft (56 N⋅m). Estimated consumption was 75 mpg‑e (45 kW⋅h/100 mi) on electricity, dropping to 28 / 32 mpg_{‑US} (8.4 / 7.4 L/100 km) for the EPA city/highway driving cycles, respectively.

The truck was approximately the same size as contemporary half-ton crew cab pickup truck competitors such as the Toyota Tundra, at 234 in (5,900 mm) long riding on a wheelbase of 143 in (3,600 mm), but was wider than most by approximately 5 to 6 in (130 to 150 mm) at 80 in (2,000 mm). The body of the W-15 was made of carbon fiber-reinforced composite materials and was based on the design of the 2014–2018 Chevrolet Silverado Double Cab. Larger W-25 and W-35 models were planned.

The stated capacities were 2,200 lb (1,000 kg) of cargo in the 6.5 ft long (2.0 m) bed and 6,000 lb (2,700 kg) towing. It weighed approximately 5,000 lb (2,300 kg) and had a GVWR of 7,200 lb (3,300 kg).

=== Powertrain ===
While the W-15 was a range extended electric pickup, the Endurance design discarded the range extender and is a plug-in electric vehicle that uses four individual wheel hub motors. As announced at its premiere in June 2020, the Endurance was the first consumer-market EV to use in-hub motors; the combined output is estimated to be 600 hp (450 kW), with a total peak / continuous torque output of 4,400 / 2,000 lb⋅ft (6,000 / 2,700 N⋅m). The Endurance was reported to be able to tow trailers up to 7,500 lb (3,400 kg). The estimated range was 250 mi (400 km) using a high-voltage storage battery of unknown capacity.

For the production Endurance, the output was revised to 515 hp (384 kW) and 4,720 lb⋅ft (6,400 N⋅m) with a towing capacity of 8,000 lb (3,600 kg). The EPA estimated the range at 174 mi (280 km), based on a tested consumption of 48 mpg‑e (70 kW⋅h/100 mi) on the combined (city/highway) cycle and a battery capacity of 109 kW-hr.

The hub motors are licensed from Elaphe Propulsion Technologies, a company based in Slovenia. Each in-hub motor was expected to weigh 70 lb (32 kg), which increases the unsprung mass, but Lordstown CEO Burns was confident the suspension and software being developed for the Endurance would overcome these challenges. The final weight of the hub motors used on the production Endurance is 85 lb (39 kg) each.

=== Chassis ===
The Endurance uses a steel body structure, with aluminum fenders, hood, doors and tailgate, as well as a 5'8" composite bed, giving it a total claimed curb weight of 6,450 lb (2,926 kg). At the front, the Endurance uses double wishbone suspension with coilovers, while at the rear, it uses a beam axle on leaf springs.

=== Performance ===
The estimated top speed is 118 mph (190 km/h) and Lordstown claims the production Endurance can accelerate from 0 to 60 mph (97 km/h) in 6.3 seconds.
