= Daniel Ninivaggi =

American automobile executive

- Born: June 27, 1964 (age 62)
- Education: Columbia University (BA); University of Chicago (MBA); Stanford Law School (JD)
- Occupation: automobile executive
- Employer: Lordstown Motors
- Known for: former CEO of Icahn Enterprises and Federal-Mogul

Daniel A. Ninivaggi (born June 27, 1964) is an American automobile executive who formerly served as the executive chairman of Lordstown Motors until its bankruptcy, and formerly its CEO. He is also the chairman of Garrett Motion, and was formerly the CEO of Icahn Enterprises as well as co-chairman, co-CEO of Federal-Mogul.

== Biography ==
Ninivaggi earned a B.A. in history from Columbia University in 1986. He played varsity golf for Columbia and was the president of the Beta Theta Pi chapter. He then received his MBA from the University of Chicago Booth School of Business in 1988 and J.D. from Stanford Law School in 1991.

After law school, he was a partner in the law firm Winston & Strawn from 1998 to 2003, and was made of counsel from 2009 to 2010.

He began his automotive career at Lear Corporation, ultimately serving as executive vice president, where he was responsible for the company's corporate development and strategy.

From 2011 until May 2012, he was also interim president and CEO of Tropicana Entertainment.

Described by The Wall Street Journal and CNBC as a lieutenant of billionaire Carl Icahn, he served various positions in the latter's Fortune 500 holding company Icahn Enterprises, from 2010 to 2014, including director, chief executive officer and president. From 2014 to 2017, he was co-chairman and co-executive officer of Federal-Mogul prior to its sale to Tenneco. He was also named to the board of Lionsgate by Icahn, but his nomination was rejected.

In 2017, he was appointed to Navistar International's board of directors. From 2014 to 2021, he was also a director of The Hertz Corporation, and helped oversee the company's bankruptcy and its successful restructuring.

In August 2021, Ninivaggi was appointed CEO of electric vehicle manufacturer Lordstown Motors after its founder and CEO, Steve Burns, resigned amidst financial and legal scrutiny into the company and its leadership. In January 2025, Ninivaggi was appointed to the Board of Directors of Indivior PLC, a specialty pharmaceuticals company.
