= Peugeot BB1 =

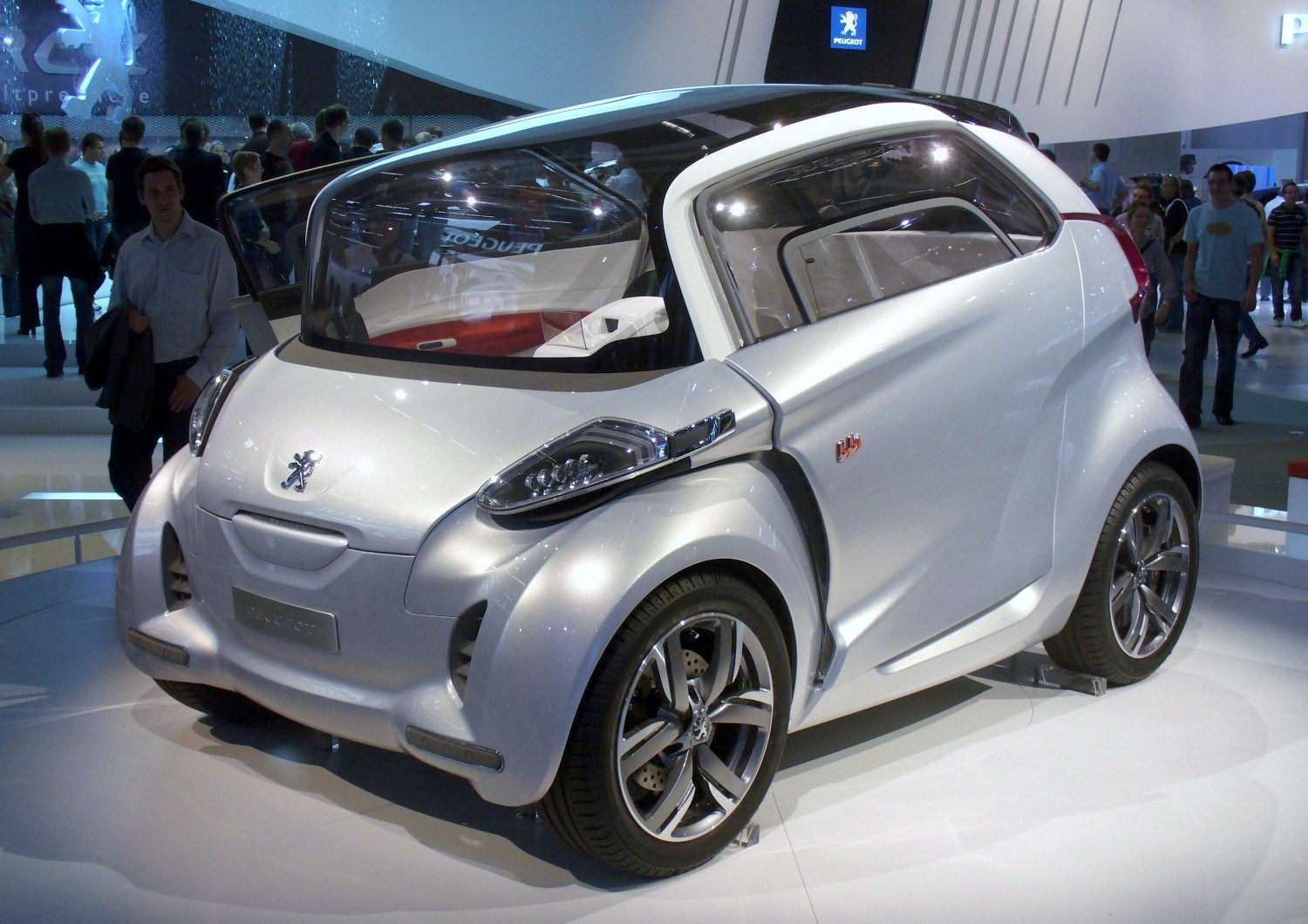

Overview
- Manufacturer: Peugeot
- Production: 2009 (Concept Car)
- Designer: Athanassios Tubidis (exterior); Neil Simpson (interior)

Body and chassis
- Class: City car (A)
- Body style: 3-door hatchback
- Doors: Suicide Doors

Powertrain
- Electric motor: 20 hp (15 kW)

Dimensions
- Wheelbase: 1.8 m (71 in)
- Length: 2.5 m (98 in)
- Width: 1.6 m (63 in)
- Height: 1.54 m (61 in)
- Curb weight: 600 kg (1,323 lb)

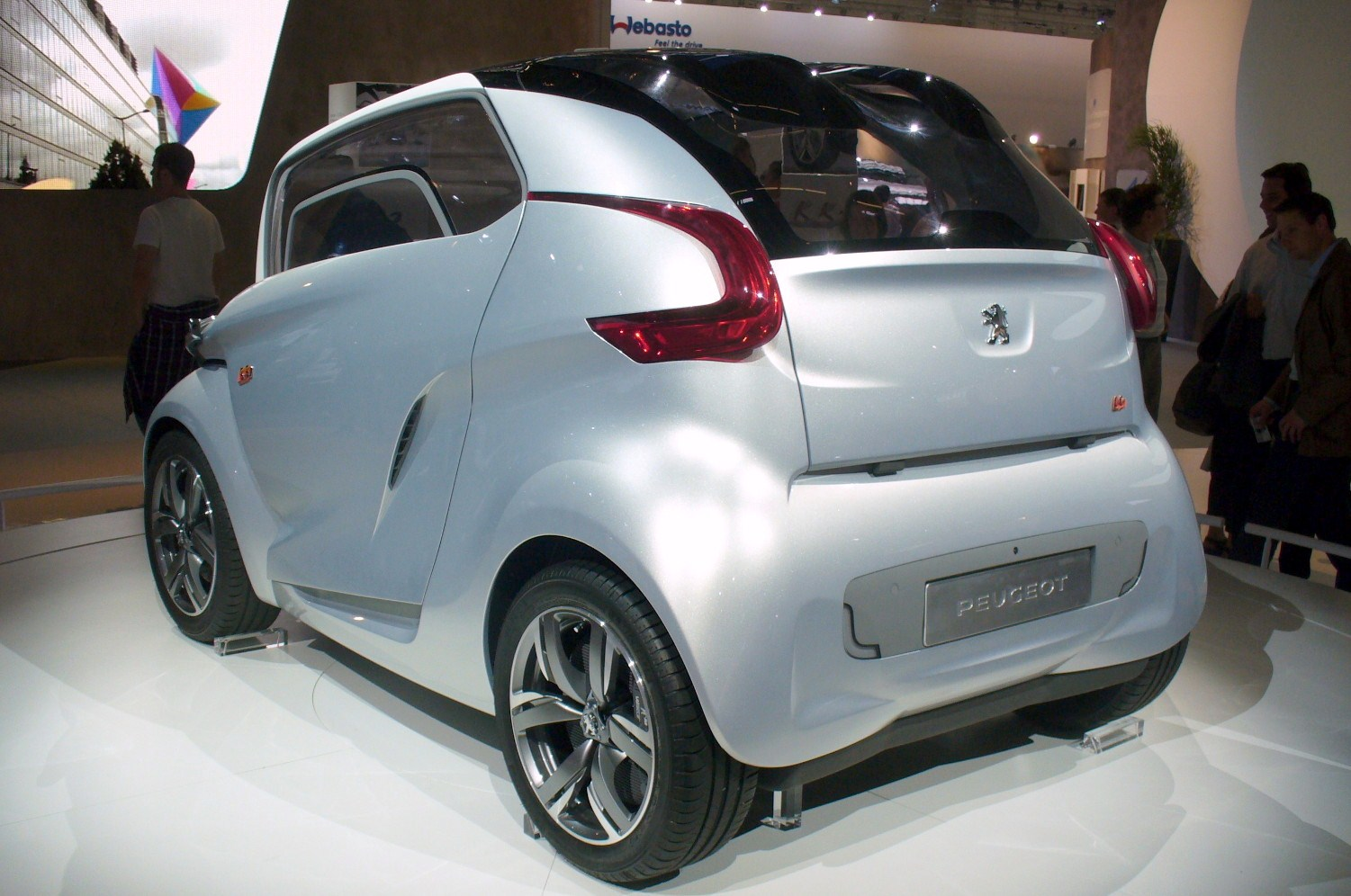
Rear view

The Peugeot BB1 is a fully electric concept city car that was introduced by Peugeot at the 2009 Frankfurt Motor Show. It incorporated rear in-wheel motors, designed in collaboration with Michelin, each with a maximum power output of 7.5 kW (10 hp) and torque on each wheel of 320 N⋅m (236 lbf⋅ft). The car included four seats, was 2.5 metres (98 in) long and 1.6 metres (63 in) wide.
