= Workhorse Group =

American manufacturing company

- Formerly: AMP Electric Vehicles (2007–15)
- Type: Public
- Traded as: Nasdaq: WKHS
- Industry: Transportation; Automotive; Aerospace
- Founded: 2007; 19 years ago
- Founder: Stephen Burns
- Headquarters: Sharonville, Ohio, U.S.
- Number of locations: 4
- Area served: North America
- Key people: Scott Griffith (CEO)
- Revenue: ▲US$21.2 million (2025)
- Net income: ▼ −US$64.1 million (2025)
- Number of employees: 200+
- Website: workhorse.com

Workhorse Group (originally AMP Electric Vehicles) is an original equipment manufacturer and technology company headquartered in Sharonville, Ohio, United States. In 2025, it merged its operations with those of Motiv Electric Trucks, forming a new entity known as Workhorse.

It makes commercial electric vehicles and telematics software designed for last-mile delivery. Its products include commercial electric vehicles and the Metron telematics software system.

== History ==
Founded in 2007 by former Lordstown Motors CEO Steve Burns, it was originally known as AMP Electric Vehicles.

The company was formed with the idea of converting passenger vehicles – originally designed with an internal combustion engine, gas tank, and related components – to electric drive. Its goal was to design an electric powertrain around a popular vehicle model, then convince the OEM that was already mass-producing that vehicle to sell it to AMP as a “glider” – a version without a drivetrain.

Over the years, however, two problems became apparent. First, the major automakers were hesitant to cooperate. Second, the passenger EV market didn't materialize quite as fast as AMP, and other manufacturers, had hoped it would.

In 2012, the commercial vehicle powerhouse Navistar decided to sell off its Workhorse subsidiary, a step van chassis manufacturer, including the Workhorse factory in Indiana. In March 2013, AMP Electric Vehicles took over Workhorse Custom Chassis, LLC's assets and began offering a range of electric vehicles.

On April 16, 2015, AMP Electric Vehicles changed its company name to Workhorse Group Incorporated. On January 4, 2016, the company was approved by Nasdaq Capital Market and its common stock started being quoted on Nasdaq under the symbol “WKHS” (NASDAQ: WKHS).

In February 2019, Steve Burns, co-founder of AMP Electric Vehicles and CEO of Workhorse resigned from the company. President and COO Duane Hughes became the new CEO of Workhorse.

In November 2021 it was reported that Workhorse faced a Department of Justice investigation as well as a SEC investigation that was first reported in a September 2021 report by shortselling research firm Fuzzy Panda who accused the company of fraud which was followed up by a Cincinnati Enquirer report which found that top Workhorse executives and board members sold off $60 million worth of stock and that part of the selling occurred following interactions with postal officials which signaled their USPS bid was in trouble. The report also stated that Workhorse was being sued by some shareholders in the company, which accuses them orchestrating its USPS as part of an insider trading scheme. On November 9, 2021, Workhorse confirmed its SEC and Department of Justice investigations in a regulatory filling which stated that the investigations were related to the trade of securities in the company leading up to the award of the USPS contract to Oshkosh.

In August 2021 Richard Dauch was appointed CEO, with the mission of resolving difficult issues Workhorse was facing and to transition Workhorse from a start-up to a leading manufacturer. By the end of 2022 all the legacy issues had been resolved, such as the securities class action lawsuit, the SEC investigation, and got Workhorse debt free. To prevent the factory being idle while the W56 was being developed, Workhorse entered into a 3-year contract manufacturing agreement with Tropos Technologies and a supply agreement with GreenPower Motor Company where Workhorse will complete the manufacturing process and sell those vehicles as W4 CC's and W750's.

=== Lordstown Plant & Licensing Agreement ===
On May 8, 2019, General Motors confirmed that it was in talks to potentially sell Lordstown Assembly, its idle 6.2 million square foot manufacturing plant in Lordstown, Ohio, to Workhorse Group. On November 7, 2019, the newly constituted Lordstown Motors, of which Workhorse Group had a 10% stake, purchased the shuttered Lordstown Assembly Plant from General Motors. Workhorse CEO Steve Burns assumed the role of co-founder and CEO of Lordstown Motors. Later that day, Workhorse Group issued a press release detailing a licensing agreement with Lordstown Motors for their W-15 pickup truck. Burns resigned as CEO of Lordstown Motors on June 14, 2021.

=== Aero Division ===
On June 12, 2024, Workhorse announced the divestiture of the Aero division. Workhorse had developed and patented various drone technologies, focused on autonomous last mile delivery.

=== Modular Data Center Business ===
In July 2026, Workhorse announced plans to enter the modular data center market with a containerized AI data center product to be manufactured at its Union City, Indiana plant. In October 2026, the company entered a partnership with London-based RHAELM Holdings to commercialize TerraPod, a modular data center platform, under which RHAELM agreed to pay Workhorse $10 million to build a full-scale manufacturing spec unit. The companies also signed a non-binding letter of intent toward a supply agreement, targeted for completion by December 31, 2026, that would include a contingent first order of 150 TerraPod systems.

== Products ==
=== Vehicles ===
==== W4 CC ====
A class 4 cab chassis battery electric commercial vehicle.

==== W750 ====
A class 4 step van battery electric commercial vehicle, with 750 cubic feet of storage space intended for last mile delivery.

==== W56 ====
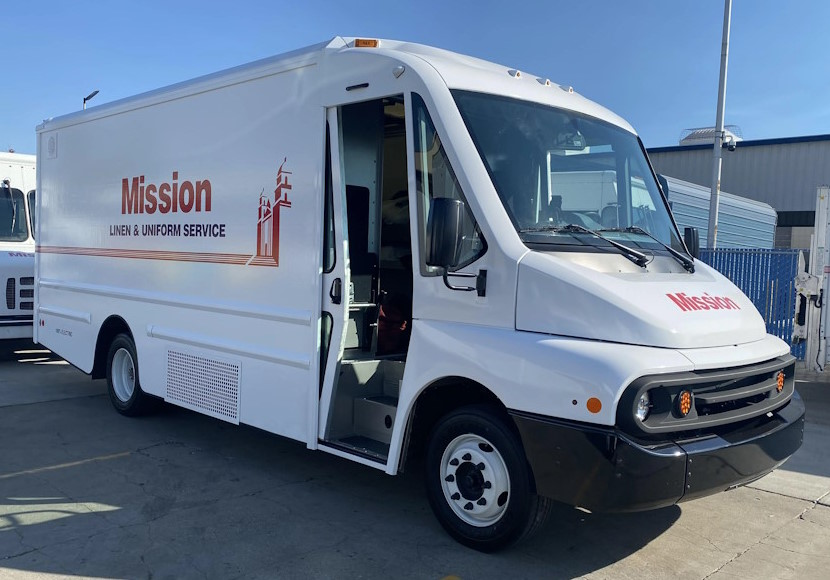
Workhorse W56 EV Stepvan.

A class 5 and 6 battery electric commercial vehicle, with 1000 cubic feet of storage space intended for last mile delivery but also available as a strip chassis and cab and chassis. The beam axle is provided by Linamar's eAxle system, stated to have superior performance and efficiency. The W56 was unveiled at the 2023 NTEA Work Truck Show. Production began in September 2023.

=== Discontinued vehicles ===
==== W-15 (pickup truck) ====
In November 2016, Workhorse announced that they were working on an electrically powered pickup truck, called the W-15. North Carolina's Duke Energy stated that it would buy 500 of the vehicles, and the city of Orlando also reported interested. It was planned to have 460 horsepower and a battery range of 80 miles. A gasoline range extender was to supply further range. In March 2020, Workhorse confirmed that it had transferred the W-15 pickup truck project to Lordstown Motors through a licensing agreement. Lordstown Motors paid a licensing fee to Workhorse, and the truck will be produced in the future without the gasoline range extender. The W-15 became the basis of the Lordstown Endurance pickup truck.

==== C-Series (electric delivery van) ====
Workhorse was one of the finalists for the 10-year United States Postal Service contract for the Next Generation Delivery Vehicle (NGDV) to replace 165,000 aging and outdated Grumman LLVs that had been used by USPS since 1987. In February 2021, the contract was awarded to Oshkosh Defense. Workhorse announced what Bloomberg News described as a "long-shot bid" to overturn the loss of the award. On June 16, 2021, Workhorse filed a formal complaint with the United States Court of Federal Claims protesting the award of the United States Postal Service Next Generation Delivery Vehicle ("USPS NGDV") contract to Oshkosh Defense. However this complaint was dropped in September 2021.

The prototype NGDV candidate chassis was modified and reused for both the W-15 pickup and the N-GEN delivery van for commercial fleets. In June 2019, Workhorse obtained US$25 million to continue the delivery van project, which had a temporary name of N-GEN. By November 2019, Workhorse changed the name of the delivery van from N-GEN to C-Series. In November 2019, Workhorse chose battery supplier EnerDel to provide up to 5,200 battery packs for C-Series delivery vans. The C-series was intended to be built at a former General Motors factory in Lordstown, Ohio.

Workhorse developed a flagship electric van model C-1000 and started shipping it in the summer of 2021. However, after the initial sales, the company announced the truck would be redesigned to increase payload capacity. In September 2021 Workhorse suspended all deliveries of the vehicle and recalled 41 vans that were already delivered to customers with the company stating that it needed to provide "additional testing and modifications" to comply with US safety standards. In November 2021 CEO Rick Dauch admitted during a conference call that he believed the C-1000 was unreliable.
