= Warren Transmission =

- Operated: 1941–2019
- Location: 23500 Mound Road; Warren, Michigan, United States
- Coordinates: 42°28′00″N 83°02′30″W
- Industry: Automotive
- Products: Transmissions
- Employees: 1,200 (2006)
- Area: 117 acres (0.47 km^{2})
- Owners: Hudson Motor Car (1941–1954); General Motors (1954–2019)
- Defunct: 2019; 7 years ago

Warren Transmission was a General Motors automotive factory in Warren, Michigan, that manufactured automotive transmissions. It was located at 23500 Mound Road and opened in 1941 as a Navy ordnance plant, built and operated by the Hudson Motor Car Company, predecessor of American Motors Corporation. The plant was located north of Warren Stamping Plant and Warren Truck Assembly.

In 2006, the factory employed 1,200 people. General Motors announced on June 1, 2006, that it would spend $332 million to expand production at Warren. On April 5, 2010, GM announced it was adding 100 jobs to the Warren Transmission plan t.

On May 31, 2017, Warren Transmission announced that the second shift would be eliminated starting June 26, 2017. On November 26, 2018, GM announced that the plant would close in 2019.

On March 20, 2020, at the height of the COVID-19 pandemic, GM announced that it would repurpose the former Warren Transmission factory for the production of face masks in order to help protect workers in essential services across the United States. On March 27, 2020, GM began production with first deliveries on April 8, 2020.

In December 2021, GM sold the 117-acre (470,000 m^{2}) property to Northpoint Development for an undisclosed price. In January 2022, it was announced that the plant would be demolished and redeveloped.

== Products ==
- 4T65-E transverse Hydra-Matic transmissions (ended production December 23, 2010)
- 6T70/6T75 transverse Hydra-Matic transmissions (used in the Chevrolet Impala and Cadillac XTS)
