= 2007 General Motors strike =

Labor strike between General Motors and the United Auto Workers

- Date: 23–25 September 2007
- Location: U.S.
- Goals: Healthcare benefits, job security

Parties
United Auto Workers	General Motors

Number
73,000	

The 2007 General Motors Strike was a labor union strike that lasted three days from September 23 to September 25, 2007, organized by the United Auto Workers (UAW) union. The UAW were engaged in talks with General Motors (GM) to negotiate a new labor contract but were unable to come to an agreement before the deadline. Consequently, 73,000 workers walked out forcing 80 GM facilities in 30 states to cease operations. After the two day strike, the two parties reached an agreement in which the UAW union would assume the responsibility for managing retiree healthcare liabilities. The UAW previously went on strike against General Motors in 1970.

== Background ==
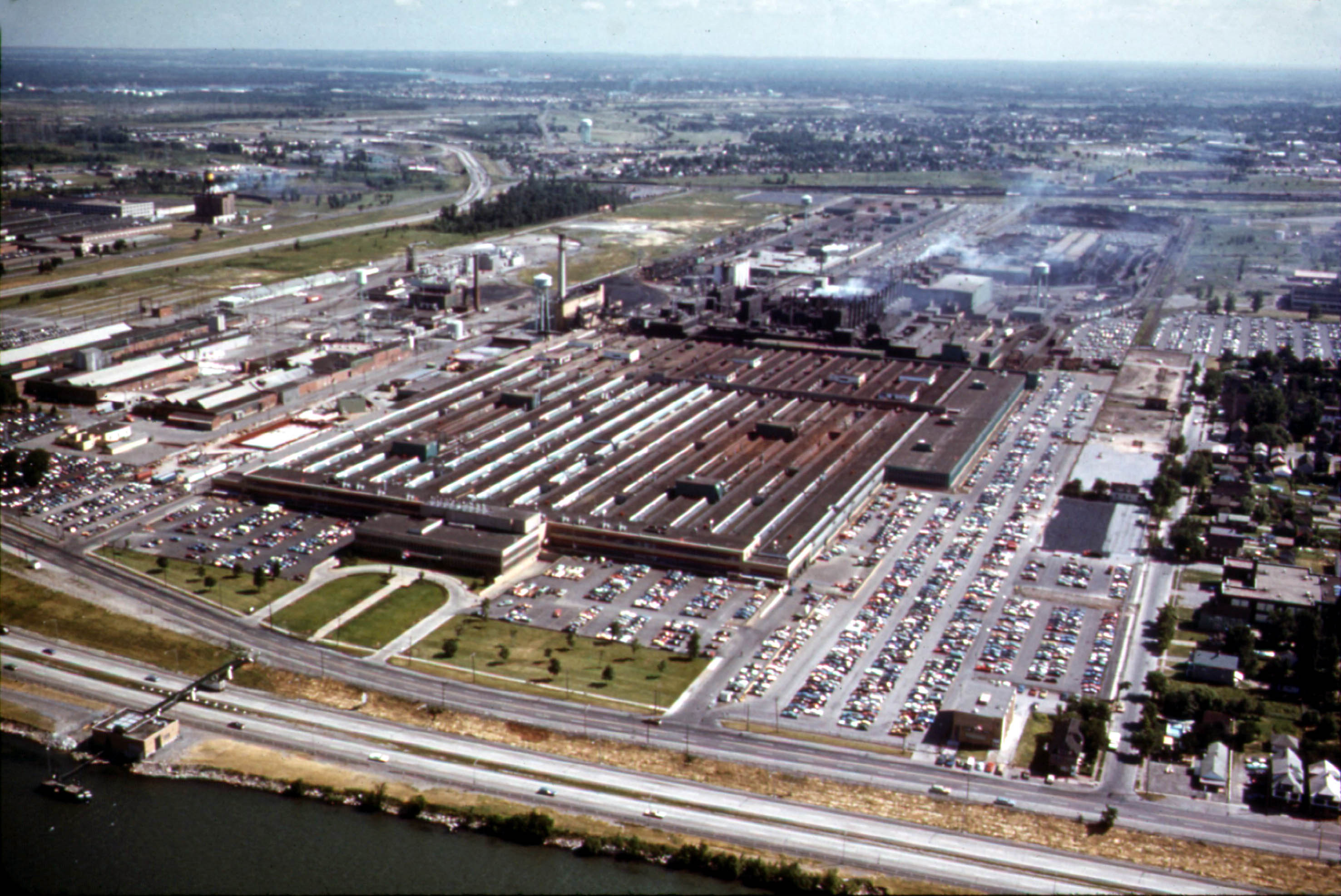
GM's Chevrolet plant in 1973

The automobile industry landscape in 2007 was drastically different to what it once was. GM's market share had been steadily decreasing as foreign automakers entered the market. Foreign players secured over 50% of market share for the first time in history in July 2007. GM's foreign competitors Nissan, Honda, and Toyota increased their production within the United States. Part of GM's struggles has been its relatively high costs of production. While many of the foreign manufacturers pay less in wages as most of their plants are not a part of a union, GM's labor contracts increase its costs per car by an estimated $2000 impacting its competitiveness. These costs can be attributed to worker pensions and healthcare programs the unions have negotiated.

The number of UAW members at GM has also steadily decreased as the company downsized. At the time of the 2007 strike, the 73,000 workers at GM are far lower than the 400,000 workers GM employed when the UAW last went on strike in 1970. The UAW's lower overall membership was also caused by the increasing prevalence of non-unionized plants and factories belonging to foreign automakers. It once had over 1.5 million workers but by 2007, that number had shrunk to just several hundred thousand.

General Motors' previous labor contract with the UAW union went up until September 14, 2007. Both parties agreed to an extension of 10 days until September 24 as the UAW felt that negotiations were still progressing. However, following the end of this 10 day period, as negotiations came to a stalemate the UAW believed a strike was necessary as GM refused to acquiesce to the UAW's demands in regards to job security and worker benefits.

== Motivations ==
General Motors' losing market share within the United States automobile market has forced the company to downsize the company. In the two years leading up to 2007, GM had incurred $12.3 billion in losses. In response, GM has since closed down numerous factories and laid off thousands of workers. At the time of the strike, GM was also planning on cutting an additional 30,000 jobs in the coming year. The UAW wanted to ensure job security for the remaining GM workers and demanded for guarantees stipulating that those workers employed under the contract would stay employed until the contract expired.

Another issue of contention between GM and UAW was the company's liabilities to retirees in regards to their healthcare benefits. These liabilities amounted to $51 billion. Both parties were in talks to discuss transferring these liabilities to a trust, which was GM's primary demand. The establishment of a voluntary employee benefit association (VEBA) has been an idea that was widely embraced by GM's investors and managers. Doing so what entail a large initial payment from GM but would allow it to remove workers healthcare benefits as a liability on its balance sheet. It was believed that removing these costs from the equation would allow GM to increase its competitiveness in the industry.

== Strike ==
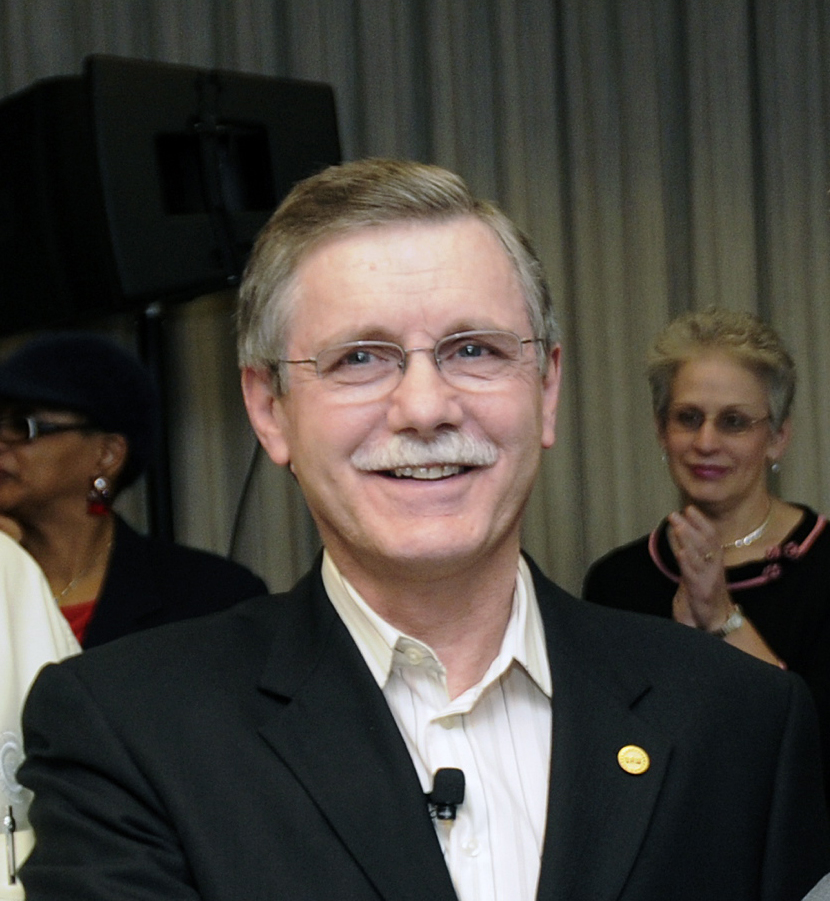
Ron Gettelfinger, President of the United Automobile Workers Union from 2002 to 2010

Immediately after the deadline had passed, the UAW union moved to a national strike that involved 73,000 workers walking out of an estimated 80 GM facilities. After the union announced the strike, negotiations continued that same afternoon lasting over five hours. In the UAW's press conference, its president Ron Gettelfinger expressed his disappointment in GM's management and their refusal to meet the union halfway. He believed that the UAW had no choice but to strike stating that: “There comes a point in time where you have to draw a line in the sand”. Many saw this as the UAW refusing to roll over to management's demands from GM. Gettelfinger also expressed that the UAW was willing to consider GM's request to form a trust to take on healthcare liabilities, and that job security remained the union's number one concern.

The effect of the strike was an operational halt that would otherwise produce 12,200 cars a day. Concerns were raised regarding the effect of the strike on GM if an agreement wasn't reached. The strike had the potential to influence GM supply chains and overseas plants that manufacture parts. Nearby operations in Mexico and Canada would also suffer as a result. The strike became a focus within the automobile industry as how it played it out would likely affect negotiations the UAW would later have with Ford and Chrysler given the vulnerable state of the United States’ auto companies.

Despite the strike, Michael Robinet, the vice president of CSM Worldwide and an expert on global vehicle forecasts, predicted that GM would not have any issues with a shortage of vehicle production. In fact, he expected that the company would not experience issues related to inventory shortages for two to three weeks should the strike continue as a result of no agreement being reached. At the time, GM's inventory levels were generally higher than that of their competitors, a point that many linked to the company's poor sales in recent months leading up to the strike.

On the first day of the strike, GM's stock closed 20 cents lower in the trading session, wiping out what was originally a gain of 2.6% earlier on in the day. The consensus amongst analysts evaluating GM's position in the strike was that while a long strike would be highly detrimental for the company as it seeks to turn its business around and become more profitable. With that said, many believed that GM would still be well positioned to endure a strike that was shorter in nature.

== Resolution ==
On September 26, it was announced that early that morning, the UAW and GM reached a deal. Specifics of the deal were not made available, however the headline for GM was that the UAW had agreed to the establishment of a VEBA that would assume the retiree healthcare liabilities worth $51 billion. Gettelfinger described that job guarantees were made by GM although the details were not disclosed.

After reaching the deal, the UAW's executives stated their intention to meet again on the 28th of September to discuss and approve the contract. If successful, the contract would then be moved to be voted on by the workers in the union to finalize the agreement. Gettelfinger expressed his confidence that GM's workers would vote in favor of this newly negotiated contract. Had the contract not been approved by both the UAW leaders and the workers, the UAW made it clear that the strike would continue.

It was reported that members who had information regarding the details of the VEBA disclosed that the trust would be funded by a combination of various assets including cash and GM stock. The trust's establishment would be subject to approval by the Security and Exchange Commission and the relevant court of law. The approval process was expected to last over a year with the earliest completion date being sometime in 2009. The agreement involved allowing GM to access the pension fund for the purpose of reimbursing retirees for the increased healthcare benefits offered in the years preceding the deal, as the pension was seen as being overfunded.

Newspapers also reported sources that indicated some of the terms of the new contract involved a steep decrease in the wages of lower tier workers along with lower signing bonuses. Other sources confirmed that the two parties agreed to meet on a yearly basis to evaluate and discuss the healthcare trust. It was reported that GM was willing to make additional contributions to the fund if it was determined to be necessary if the amount was within a range the company considered reasonable.

== Impact ==
It was also expected that the leaders of the UAW would discuss the details of the GM contract with labor officials at the other large automobile manufacturers, Ford and Chrysler, as a part of a series of labor contract negotiations within the industry. At the time, the UAW union was also in negotiations with them over new labor contracts although little progress had been made. Many experts pointed out the possibility that both Ford and Chrysler could establish similar VEBA trusts which would reduce liabilities, something that many of these companies have looked forward to. GM believed that the agreement would allow them to "significantly improve its manufacturing competitiveness".

Investor sentiment regarding the deal being reached was generally positive for GM as they have been proponents for the establishment of the VEBA trust. After the deal was reached between GM and the UAW union, the stock price of GM increased by 4.2% in the morning of that trading session, and closed with a 9% rise reaching its highest mark in ten weeks. GM's bond prices also increased following the news. The stock price of Ford increased by more than 6% in the same session, likely linked to investor expectations that a similar deal would be reached in their negotiations with the UAW.

Credit rating agencies shared a similarly positive response to the deal. Fitch was in discussions to lower GM's rating and that of some of its suppliers, however decided to hold off after the new deal was announced. Standard and Poor’s discussed the possibility of increasing GM's long term rating moving forward. GM pointed out their healthcare spending in the previous year totaled $4.8 billion, an amount that could have been spent towards launching six vehicle models or building an additional four manufacturing plants. Wall street analysts were expecting GM to benefit from increased healthcare cost savings amounting to $3 billion annually as a consequence of the newly established VEBA trust.
