= Lordstown Assembly =

Factory building in Lordstown, Ohio, U.S.

Coordinates: 41°8′48.42″N 80°52′36.63″W

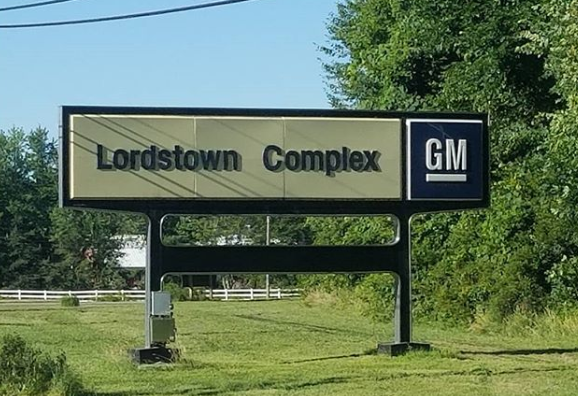
- Entrance to Lordstown Assembly from Ohio State Route 45
- Built: 1964–1966
- Location: Lordstown, Ohio
- Industry: Automotive industry
- Owners: General Motors (1966–2019); Lordstown Motors (2019–2022); Foxconn (2022–present)

The Lordstown Complex is a factory building and automotive manufacturing plant in Lordstown, Ohio, U.S. Lordstown is an industrial suburb of Youngstown, Ohio.

It was a General Motors automobile factory from 1966 to 2019, comprising three facilities: Vehicle Assembly, Metal Center, and Paint Shop. Lordstown was opened to build compact cars for Chevrolet, the Vega/Monza, Cavalier, Cobalt, Cruze, and their rebadged variants, mostly for Pontiac. The plant also built the Chevrolet van and its GMC variant (Handi-Bus/Handi-Van, Rally Van and Vandura) until 1995.

In November 2019, the plant was sold to Lordstown Motors which produced to manufacture the Lordstown Endurance electric pickup truck there from 2022 to 2023.

In 2022, Foxconn purchased the plant. They planned to manufacture the Fisker Pear there, however, these were scrapped following the bankruptcy of Fisker in 2024.

== History ==
=== Early years ===
GM representatives purchased the farmland in 1955, but at the time would not divulge specifics except that it was for manufacturing and that its location along the then new Ohio Turnpike made it an ideal location for the plant. GM publicly announced plans for the plant on March 19, 1956, for Chevrolet, with plans to build the division's entire model line except the Chevrolet Task Force and heavy duty trucks, the latter then exclusively built at Willow Run Assembly. Despite plans to open the plant by 1957, the construction began in 1964 and the first Impala rolled off the line on April 28, 1966.

The plant's initial products were Chevrolet's full-size lineup (Caprice, Impala, Bel Air, Biscayne), then America's best-selling vehicle, as well as the first generation Pontiac Firebird. The Firebird and Chevrolet's full-size models would be moved to other plants by 1971, when the plant added conversion van production and began production of the Chevrolet Vega.

=== GM Strike of 1972 ===
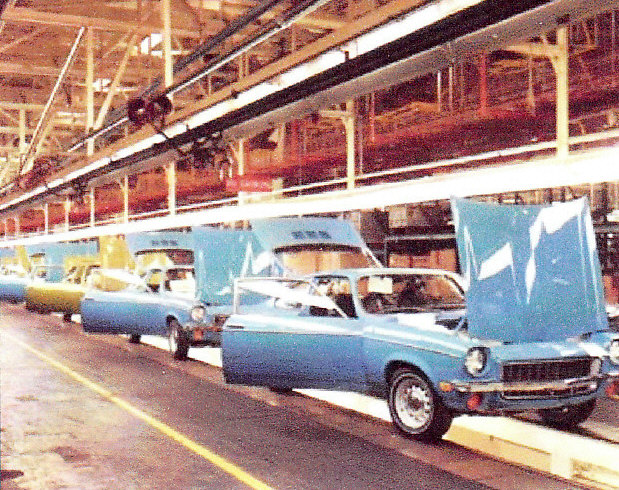
Chevrolet Vega being assembled at Lordstown, 1972

This assembly plant was the place of the notorious Lordstown Strike of 1972, a strike against management at the GM plant. The strike resulted in Chevys coming off the line with torn upholstery and other defects. The strike lasted a total of 22 days and cost GM US$150 million (equivalent to $1.2 billion in 2025). Later strikers elsewhere who similarly engaged in disrupting production lines were labeled as having "Lordstown Syndrome". According to Peter Drucker, a management consultant, it was not just the rigid discipline of the assembly line, or the speedup of operation, but rather that the workers almost unanimously felt they could have done a better job at designing much of their own work than GM's industrial engineers (hence the need to include the floor workers in part of the plant design process). Due to their "hippyness" long hair, and mod fashion, the strikers were referred to by Newsweek magazine as an "industrial Woodstock".

The Lordstown Strike of 1972 was part of the broader mass labor unrest of the 1970s, an era which witnessed the second most labor strikes after 1946. The strike affected the quality of the Vega, and it can be argued that the Vega's overall reliability, caused by labor issues at the plant, led to the Vega eventually being named one of the worst cars of all time. Despite that, quality control improved at the plant enough that GM awarded the plant the J-body models for 1981. Lordstown eventually became the sole plant building them, a GM tradition where the core brands originated from one factory, and knock-down kits were sent to branch assembly plants in major American cities to meet local demand. In addition to having an effect on GM car quality, the Lordstown Strike of 1972 showed building conflict between employees and management. The assembly line's unflexible, dehumanizing structure and the absence of worker input in design choices were the main causes of the walkout. The increase in production speed, that made workers feel unappreciated, increasing their level of patience. The strike was taken advantage of by the factory's employees, many of whom were young and affiliated with the countercultural movement, to call for more freedom and a more team-oriented production process. The limits of the traditional union methods were brought to light by this strike that offered a change in labor relations. The workers' ability to stop production was a form of protest that spread beyond of the GM facility, causing other firms to experience similar effects and delays. A system where employees "controlling" certain aspects of the production process would be a model for active leadership. Regardless, the strike had a major negative effect on GM's financial results since the business lost millions of dollars in manufacturing expenses and its reputation was damaged by subpar cars. The strike raised awareness of the period's more general economic problems, like inflation and unstable economies, which fueled the labor rebellion of the 1970s. The walkout made an impression that will not be forgotten on labor history and showed the growing need for workers' voices to be heard in business decisions and processes, even though GM later resumed operations.

=== Later years ===
Following the collapse of the steel industry in the Mahoning Valley in the late 1970s and early 1980s, Lordstown Assembly became the area's largest industrial employer. Youngstown State University surpassed Lordstown Assembly as the area's largest employer by the mid-2000s. Local health care provider Mercy Health also surpassed Lordstown Assembly in total employment. Conversion van production at Lordstown ended when production of the Chevrolet van's successor, the Chevrolet Express, moved to the Wentzville Assembly in 1994, leaving Lordstown to focus exclusively on compact cars.

In 2006, as part of GM scaling back production nationwide, the third shift at the Lordstown plant ceased operations. An employee buyout and early retirements eliminated the need for layoffs. In the summer of 2008, when gas prices soared, the third shift returned in August due to increased demand for the Chevrolet Cobalt, resulting in the creation of nearly 1,000 jobs. Shortly after, General Motors entered bankruptcy and two shifts were cut.

During the 2008 presidential campaign, both Hillary Clinton and John McCain made stops at Lordstown. Shortly after election Barack Obama visited Lordstown to celebrate new product announcements and to proclaim success for the auto industry rescue.

In 2010, in preparation to build the new compact Chevrolet Cruze, all members laid off from the plant returned to work. Numerous workers from shuttered GM plants in the US were moved to Lordstown for the open positions.

In 2014, a 2.2 MW solar array was installed, covering six and a half acres with 8,500 solar panels.

=== Closure ===
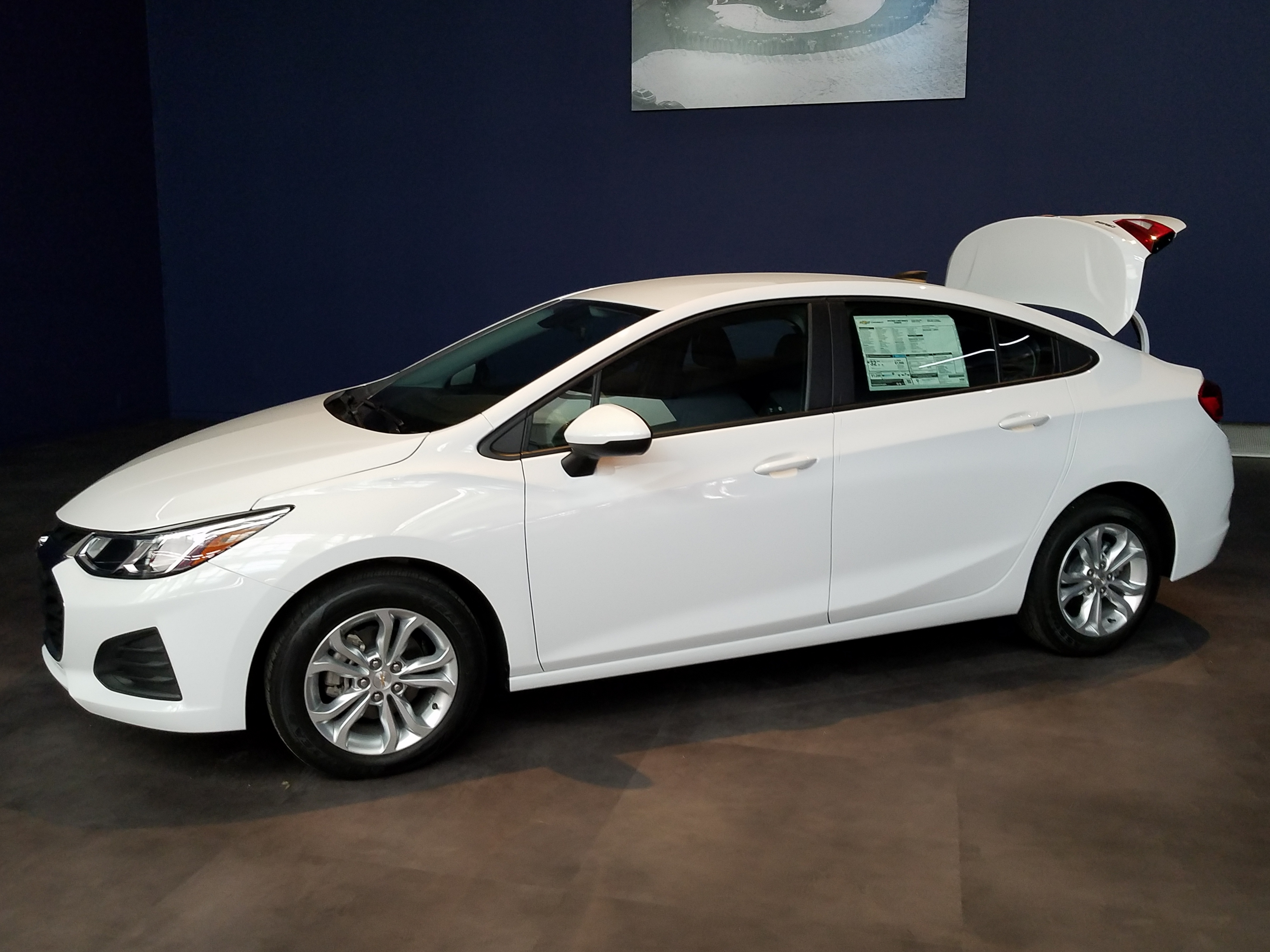
The final Chevrolet Cruze built at the GM Lordstown assembly plant

In November 2016, GM announced to end the third shift by January 2017, affecting 1,200 workers. On April 13, 2018, GM announced that the second shift would be cut, eliminating up to 1,500 jobs. The cuts were related to declining sales of the Cruze (and compact cars in general) in favor of SUVs and crossovers, including GM's own GMC Terrain and Chevrolet Equinox, both of which are loosely related to the Cruze and get similar gas mileage numbers as the Cruze. GM announced it would build the new Chevrolet Blazer at Ramos Arizpe Assembly in Mexico on the same day Lordstown's second shift ended, angering the United Auto Workers.

On Monday, November 26, 2018, GM announced that the plant would be unallocated in 2019. Many, including the area's U.S. representative Tim Ryan, considered the closing their generation's "Black Monday", in reference to Youngstown Sheet and Tube's announcement on Monday, September 19, 1977 that led to the collapse of the steel industry in the area four decades prior.

The last day of production was March 6, 2019. Subsequently, the plant was transitioned to an idled state. The final vehicle built at Lordstown, a white 2019 Chevrolet Cruze LS, remained in the area and was delivered to a local Chevrolet dealership after making arrangements with GM to keep the vehicle in the area after a local GM customer requested it; the dealer made a vehicle swap with a dealer in Miami that was originally scheduled to receive the vehicle and was already sold before it left the plant.

=== Lordstown Motors era ===
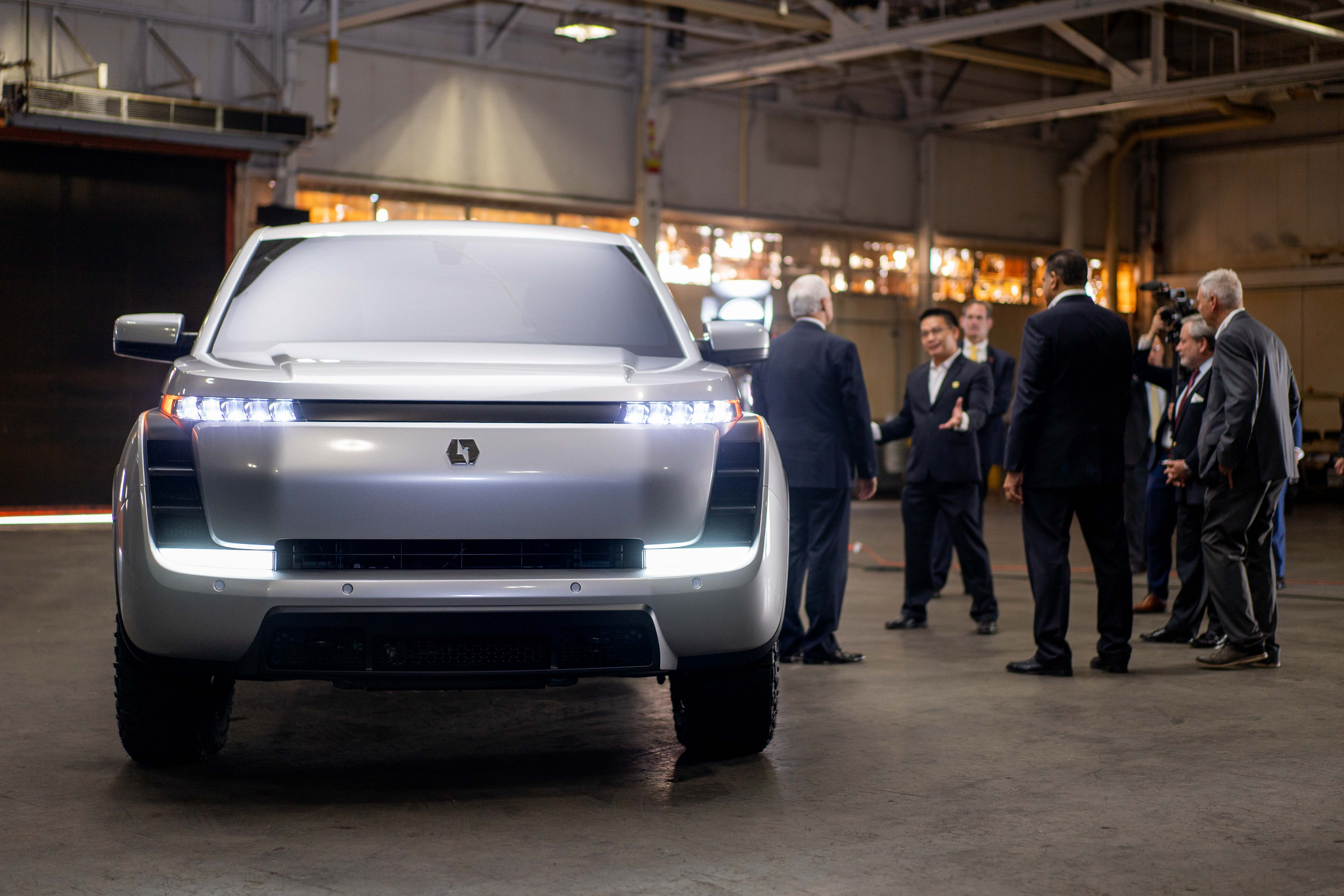
A Lordstown Endurance electric pickup exhibited during the Vice President Mike Pence visit to the factory in June 2020

Shortly after the shutdown, GM entered talks with electric truck maker Workhorse Group to sell the plant. They required the approval of the UAW, but did not get it until October, following a month-long strike.

On November 7, 2019, the plant was sold to Lordstown Motors, which is 10% owned by Workhorse Group, licensing their electric-drive technology. The purchase price was not disclosed, but Reuters reported it was similar to EV start-up Rivian Automotive LLC's 2017 acquisition of a former Mitsubishi plant in Normal, Illinois, for US$16 million. They plan to manufacture an electric pickup truck called the Endurance there. GM loaned Lordstown Motors US$40 million in 2019 to underwrite a substantial part of the plant purchase.

=== Foxconn era ===
Foxconn later purchased unused space in the plant to establish an auto manufacturing facility in the U.S. for its proposed electric vehicle such as the Fisker Inc. PEAR. As part of the deal Foxconn will also oversee production of the Endurance Pickup truck. On August 9, 2021, Foxconn announced that it would also produce battery packs and the Monarch MX-V smart electric tractor for Monarch Tractor.

== Vehicles produced ==
Model years	Product	Numbers produced
1966–1970	Chevrolet Caprice, Impala, Bel Air, Biscayne	453,086
1967–1969	Pontiac Firebird	220,230
1971–1977	Chevrolet Vega	1,966,157 (Note: includes additional '73-'74 GM of Canada production.)
1971–1992	Chevrolet Van	1,948,468
1971–1992	GMC Vandura	423,547
1975–1977	Pontiac Astre	132,046
1977–1980	Chevrolet Monza/Pontiac Sunbird	893,734
1978–1980	Buick Skyhawk/Oldsmobile Starfire	101,907
1982–1994	Chevrolet Cavalier/Pontiac J2000/Sunbird	3,744,631
1995–1997	Chevrolet Cavalier/Pontiac Sunfire	843,741
Total through 1997		10,727,547
1996–2000	Toyota Cavalier	36,228
1998–2005	Chevrolet Cavalier/Pontiac Sunfire	
2005–2010	Chevrolet Cobalt	
2005–2009	Pontiac Pursuit/G4/G5	
2011–2019	Chevrolet Cruze	
2023	Lordstown Endurance	
