= Wheel hub motor =

Electric motor in the middle of a wheel

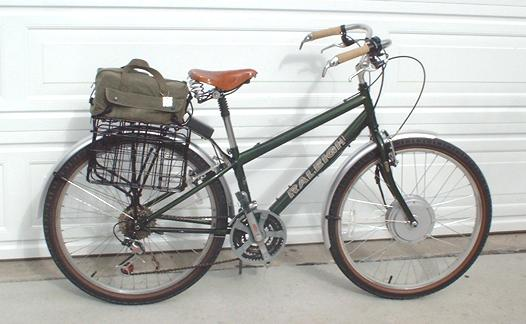
Raleigh SC30 converted to an electric bicycle with an aftermarket electric conversion hub motor kit

A wheel hub motor, hub motor, or in-wheel motor is a motor that is incorporated into the hub of the wheel. Wheel-hub motors are commonly found on electric bicycles, but there are also examples of wheel hub combustion engines. Electric hub motors were well received in early electric cars, but have not been commercially successful in modern production cars because they negatively affect vehicle handling due to higher dynamic wheel load and their placement makes them prone to damage.

== Bicycles ==
Patents for electric bicycles with hub motors were granted as early as 1895. Bicycle hub motors are simple, durable, and affordable compared to other designs, but less suitable for high speeds. Hub motors rose in popularity over other designs in the late 2000s and 2010s.

== Automotive ==
=== History ===
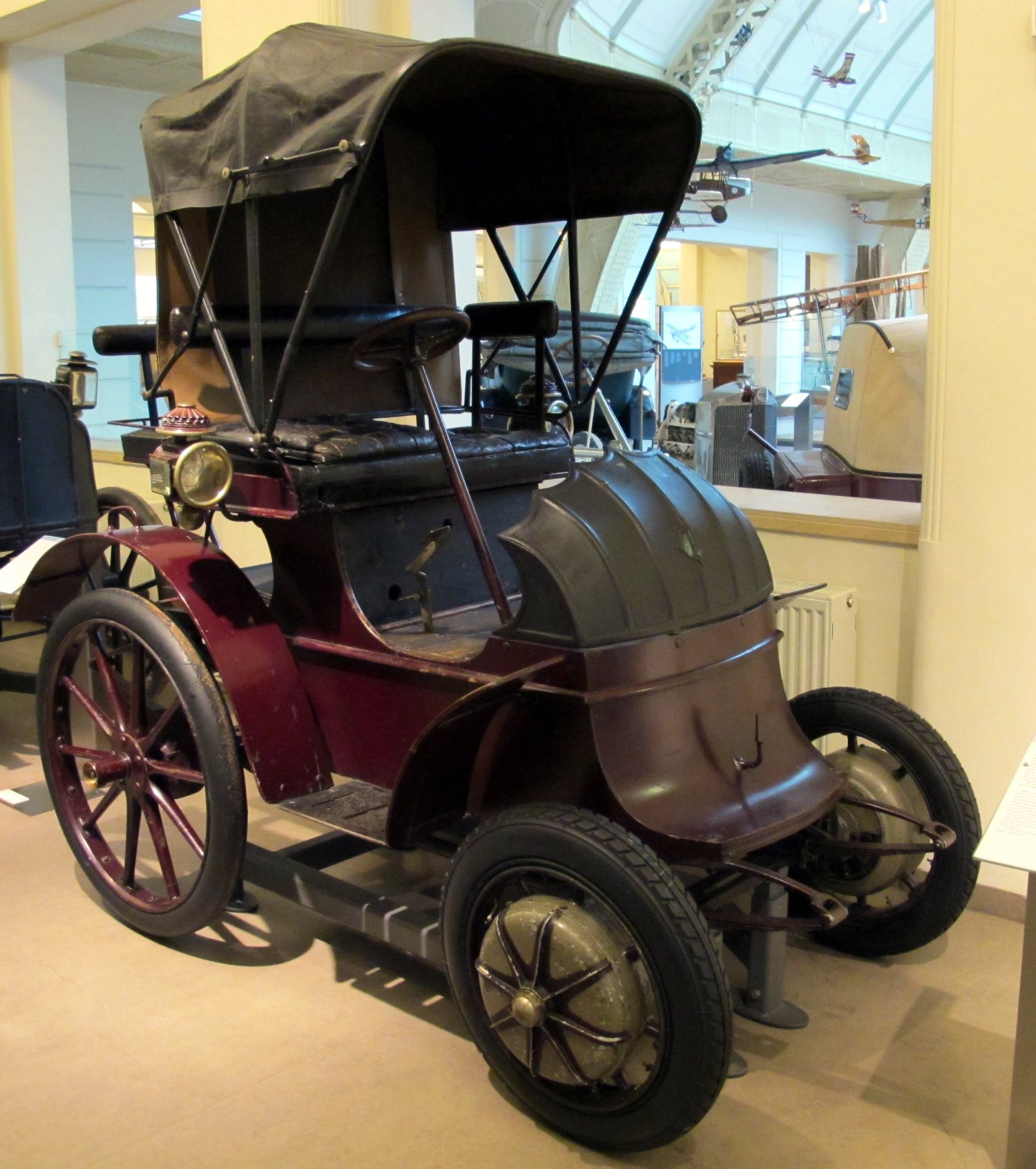
1900 Lohner-Porsche "Chaise" battery electric vehicle with two front-wheel hub motors

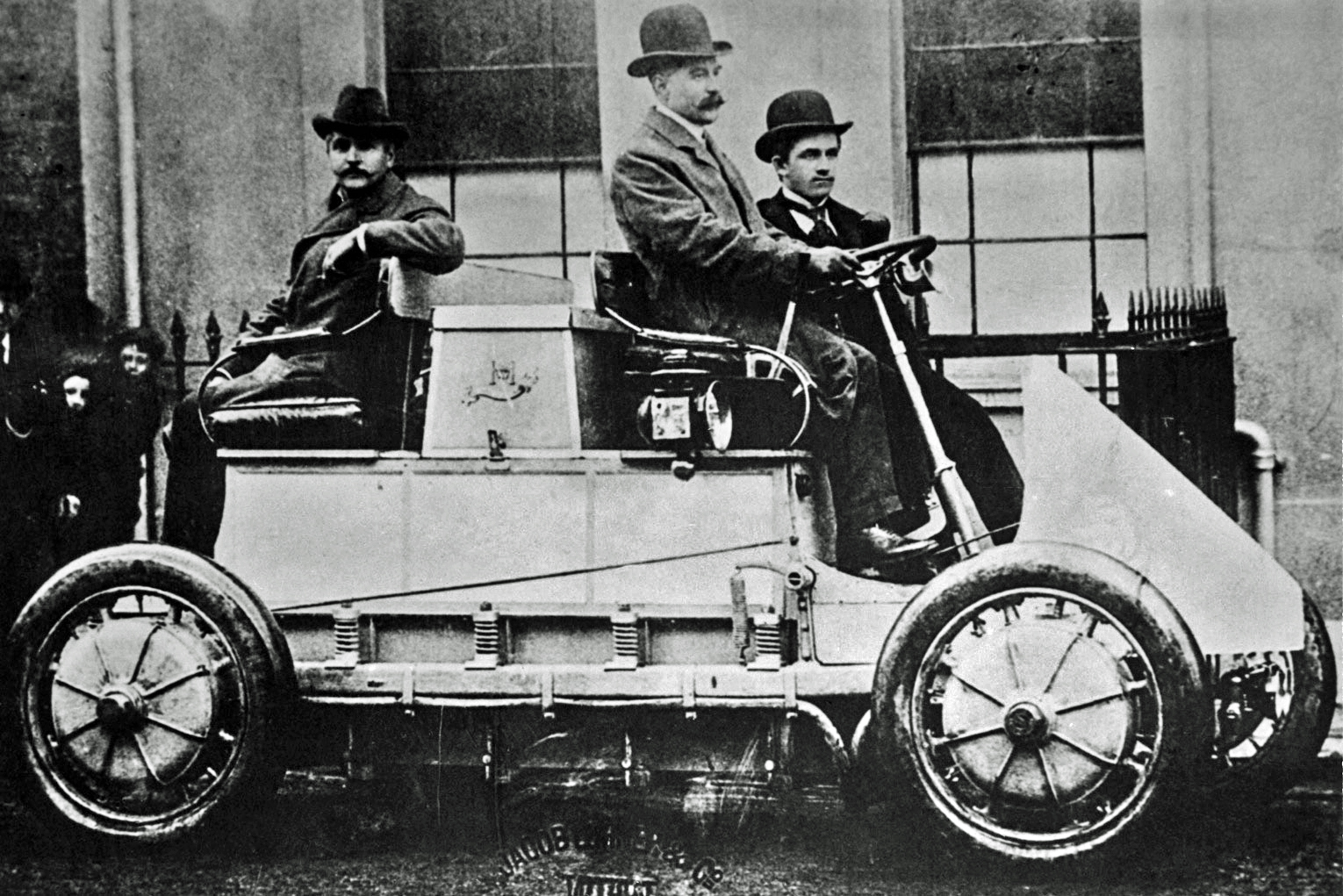
1900 Lohner–Porsche "Mixte" racecar with four wheel-hub motors

Several electric, combustion, and steam powered in-wheel motor designs were patented in the 1880s and 1890s. Among those who were awarded patents: Wellington Adams of St. Louis in 1884; Edward Parkhurst of Woburn in 1890; Albert Parcelle later in 1890; Charles Theryc in 1896, who cites no transmission losses thanks to an absence of classic transmission rods from engines to wheels; C. F. Goddard in 1896 who cites a piston hub motor for horseless carriages powered by expanding gas of some kind; and W. C. Smith in 1897 who cites an explosive gas expansion motor inside a wheel hub that utilized cams on a track in the hub to transmit power to the wheel.

An electric wheel hub motor car was raced by Ferdinand Porsche in 1897 in Vienna, Austria. He developed his first cars as electric cars with electric wheel hub motors that ran on batteries. A racecar by Lohner–Porsche fitted with four wheel-hub motors debuted at the World Exhibition in Paris in 1900. Alongside it a commercial model was introduced, the Lohner–Porsche Chaise, with two front wheel-hub motors. It was well-received, and several models based on its design were produced by Lohner and other manufacturers until the 1920s.

=== Design ===
Hub motors may be implemented with direct-drive or planetary gears. They rotate the wheel either through an axial, inrunner, or outrunner rotor design, with either brushed or brushless commutator design.

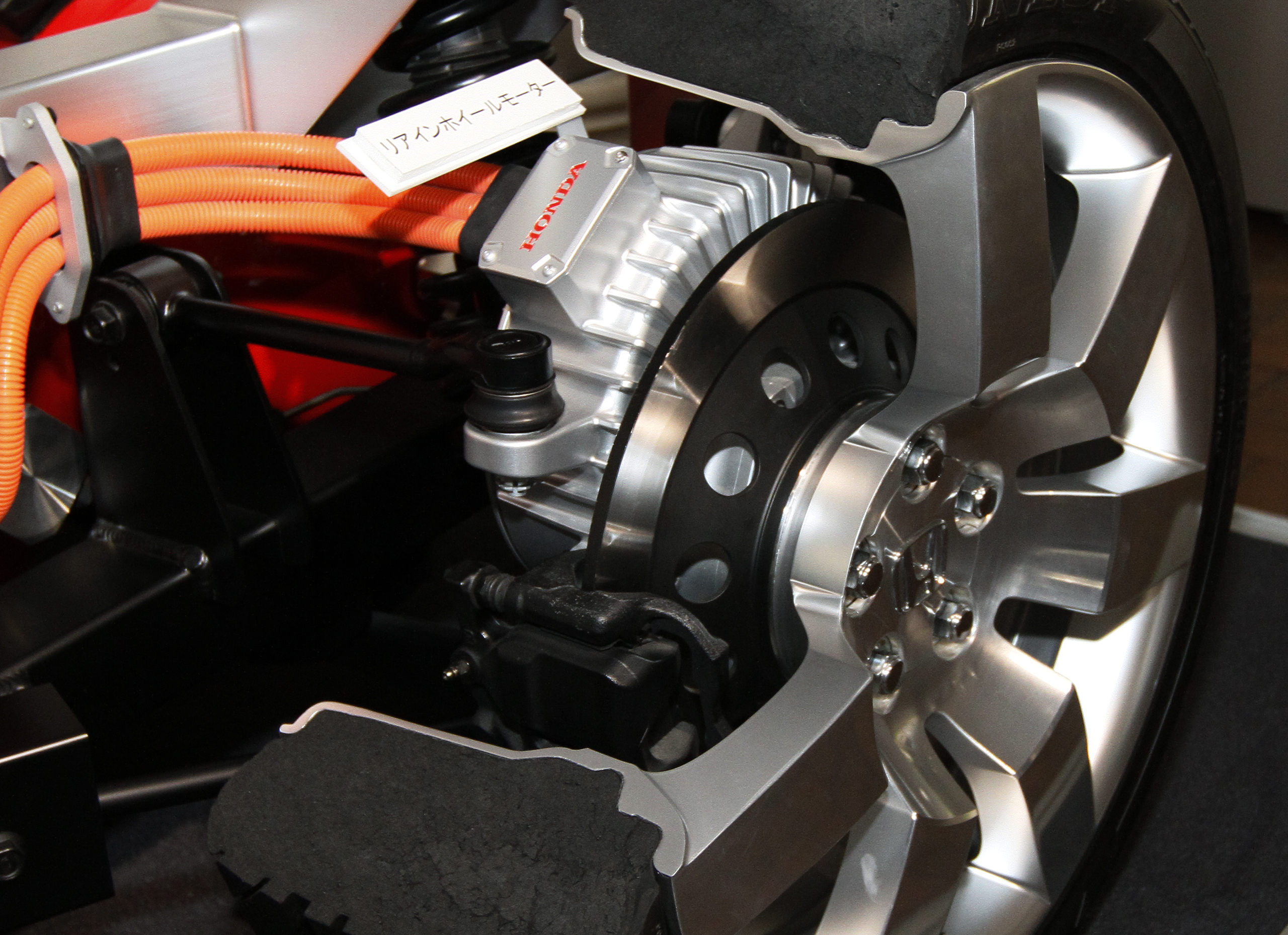
Honda FCX Concept 2005 in-wheel motor with high-voltage wires in orange. Running high voltage outside the chassis can be avoided by using near-wheel motors, which have similar advantages to in-wheel motors.

Hub motors are attractive from a design standpoint because of their flexibility. They can be used for front-, rear-, or individual-wheel drive. They are compact and hence allow for more room for passengers, cargo, or other vehicle components. They allow for better weight distribution compared to a single motor, and they eliminate the need for many of the drive components in traditional vehicles like transmissions, differentials, and axles, which reduces wear and mechanical losses. High-voltage in-wheel motors must be robust against damage to their high-voltage cables and components.

=== Unsprung weight ===
One disadvantage of a wheel hub motor is that the weight of the motor is not supported by the suspension's shock absorbers, adding to the vehicle's unsprung weight which adversely affects handling and ride quality. Despite this reduction in ride quality with electric hub motors, it is still better than the ride quality of equivalent combustion engine vehicles, but vehicle handling is still negatively affected due to higher dynamic wheel load. Protean Electric and Lotus found that most negative effects of added unsprung mass could be eliminated by adding suspension damping, and that the ability to utilize accurate torque vectoring actually improved car's handling so much that the net effect of the whole arrangement was positive.

Without being supported by the suspension's shock absorbers, in-wheel motors are themselves less shielded both from shocks and debris, reducing their durability. Some designs reduce unsprung weight by reducing the weight of the motor, for example by using a coreless design or Litz wire coil windings. These weight-saving designs may have a negative effect on motor durability.

=== Near-wheel motors ===
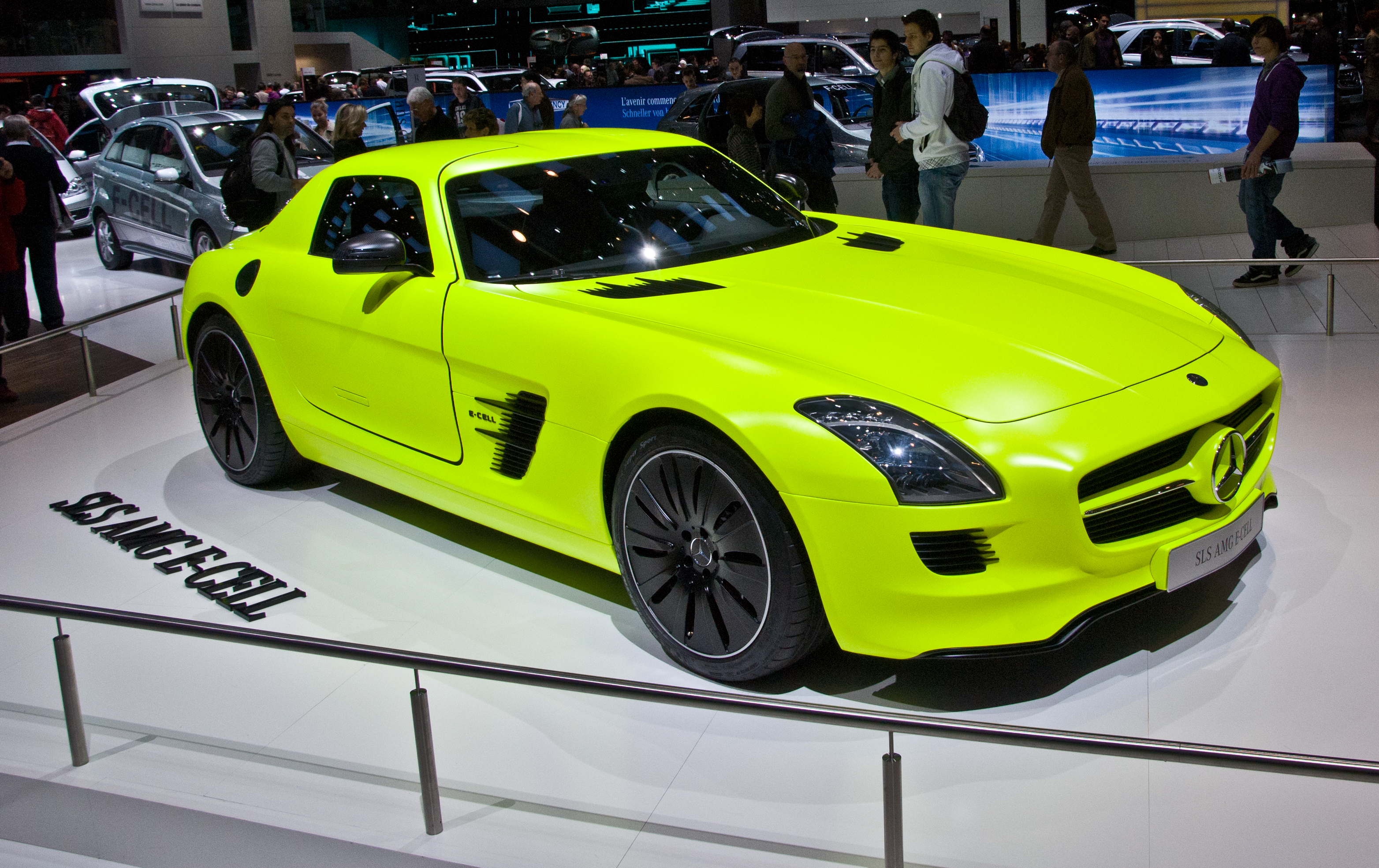
2011 Mercedes-Benz SLS AMG E-Cell prototype with four near-wheel motors which share the advantages of in-wheel motors while avoiding issues of unsprung weight and wear

Similar to in-wheel motors, electric vehicles can be designed with near-wheel motors, sometimes called wheel-end motors. This design shares the same advantages as in-wheel motors while avoiding unsprung weight and wear issues, as the motors are near the wheels but inside the chassis, supported by the suspension. Near-wheel motors are less compact than in-wheel motors, but as of 2022 they are more reliable and more cost-effective, they avoid the risks associated with out-of-chassis high-voltage components, and they simplify vehicle design and assembly.

American Axle has developed 100 kW and 150 kW wheel-end motors through a project funded by the United States Department of Energy for the commercialization of clean-energy low-cost wheel-end motors. Costs were lowered by integrating the motor, inverter, and gear reduction into a single unit, and by avoiding heavy rare earth elements. The 100 kW 3-in-1 wheel-end drive unit was planned for the REE Automotive vehicle product line. Production was planned for 2025 but it was halted after REE couldn't secure major automaker partners or large institutional buyers.

=== Concept cars ===
An early modern concept car utilizing electric hub motors was the IZA, presented in at the IEEE conference in 1997, built with four 25 kW (34 hp) motors.

Other concept cars presented at auto shows include: Chevrolet Sequel, 2005; Mitsubishi MIEV, 2005; Hi-Pa Drive Mini QED, 2006; Honda FCX concept, 2005; Citroën C-Métisse, 2006; Protean Electric Ford F-150, 2008; Heuliez WILL using the Michelin Active Wheel suspension, 2008; Peugeot BB1, 2009; Hiriko Fold, shown in 2012, a folding urban car with a maximum speed of 50 km/h (31 mph) with a motor, steering actuators, suspension, and brake integrated into each wheel, controlled with a drive-by-wire system; FlatFormer, a concept 6x6 autonomous truck chassis, shown in 2019; various vehicles by Indigo Technologies since 2019; Aptera Motors prototype in 2022 though the 2024 Aptera prototypes did not feature in-wheel motors; and Italdesign Quintessenza with Elaphe Sonic in-wheel motors in 2025.

Concept cars that were announced without publicly presenting a physical model include: Siemens VDO eCorner concept, 2006; and ZAP-X, 2007.

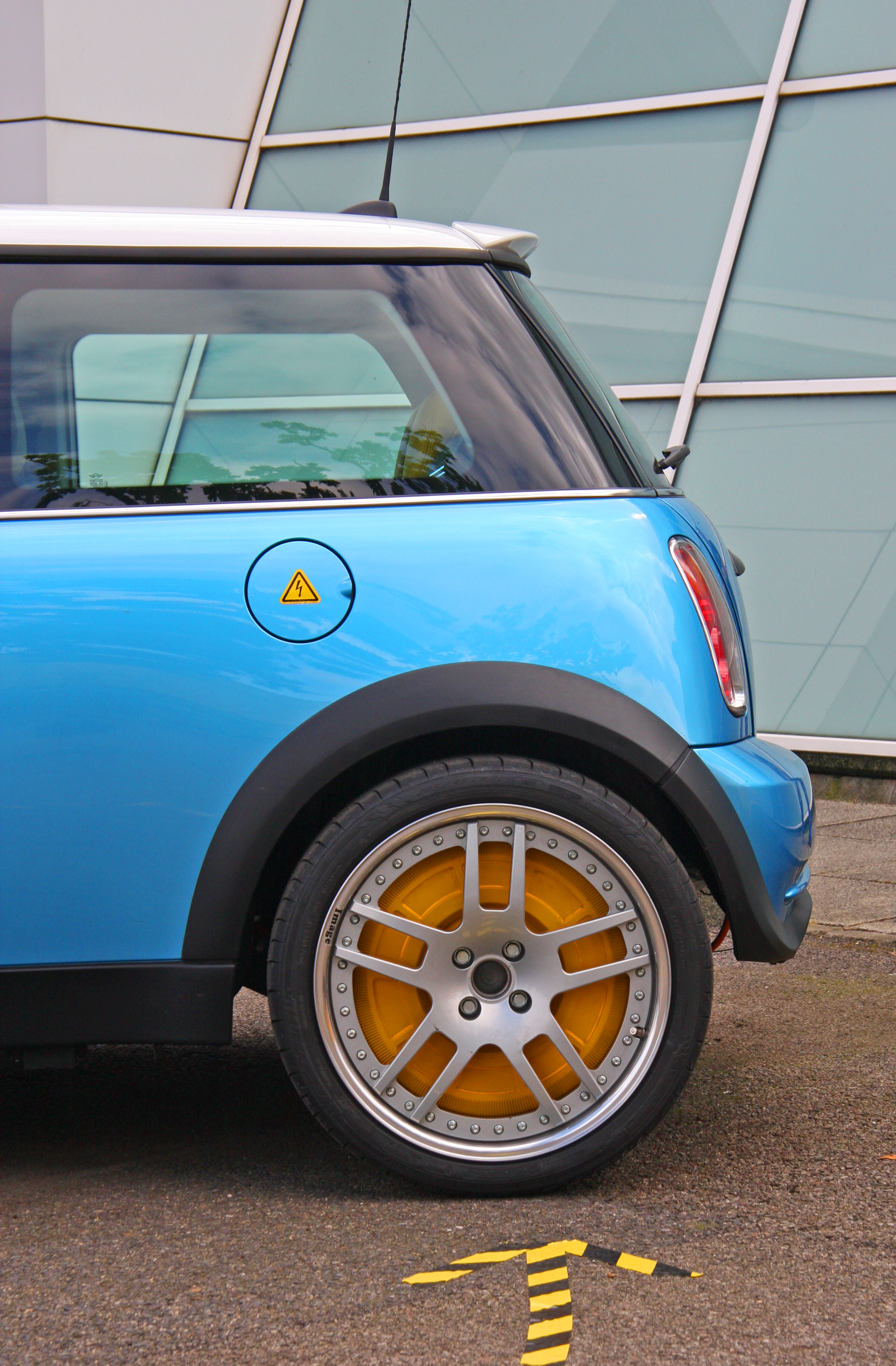
Mini QED electric vehicle

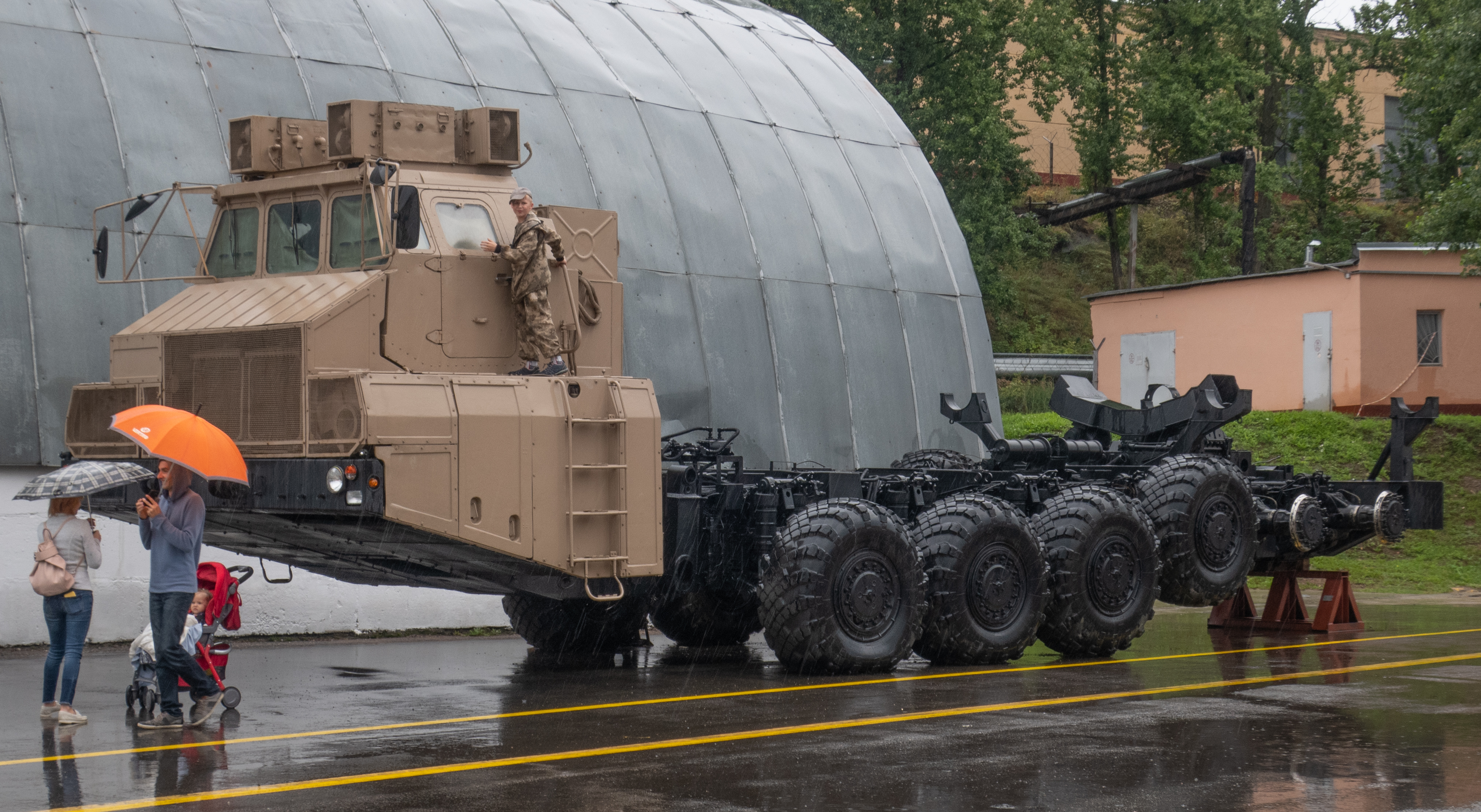
MAZ-7907 truck. Each wheel has its own electric motor

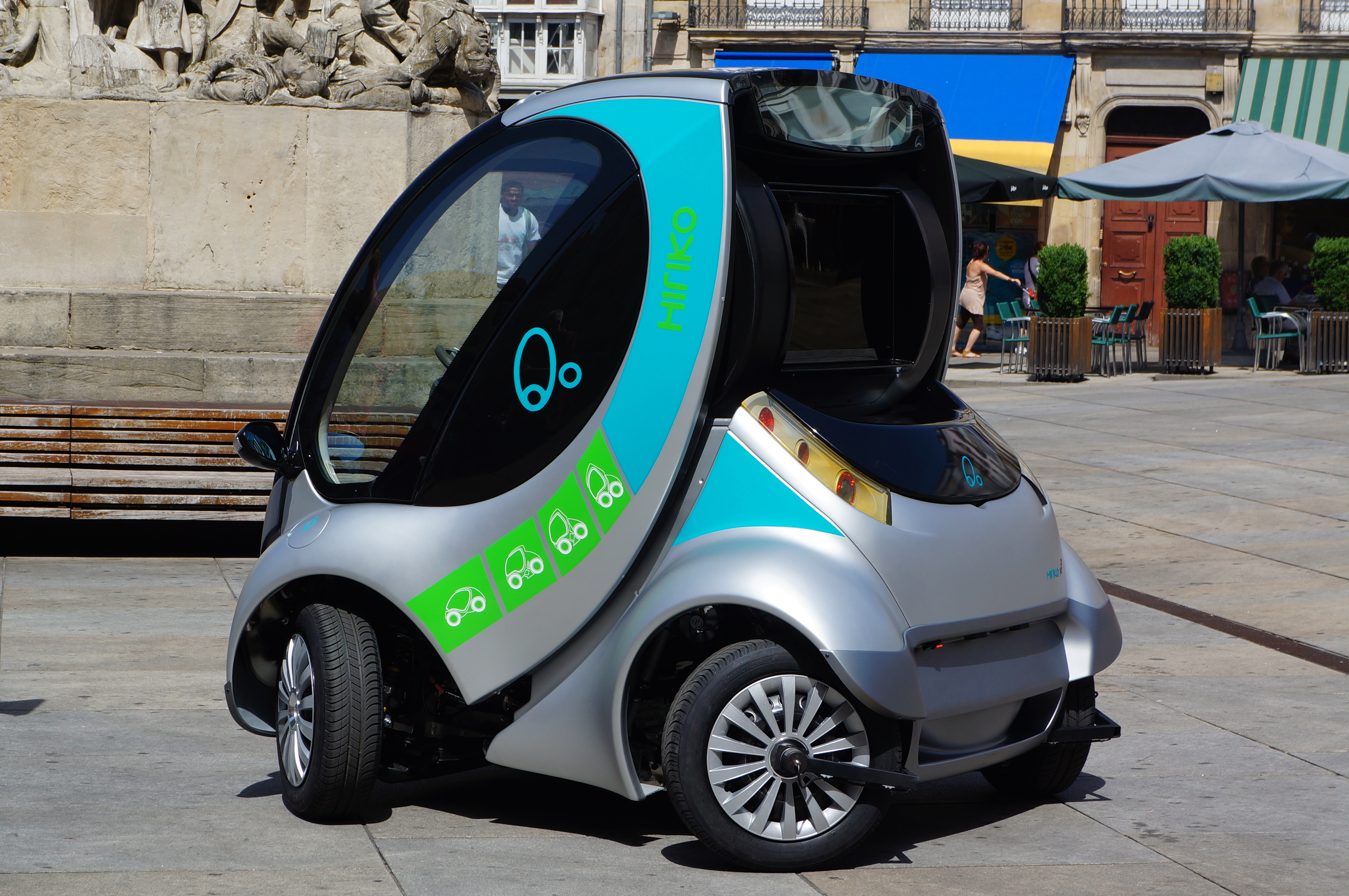
Hiriko Fold with in-wheel motor, steering actuators, suspension, and braking, controlled by a drive-by-wire system

=== Production vehicles ===
Production vehicles with in-wheel motors include:

- Lohner–Porsche Chaise, Mixte, and others. Several models based on this design were produced by Lohner and other manufacturers in the early 1900s.
- Lightyear 0 with Elaphe in-wheel motors, briefly produced in 2022 before its manufacturer filed for bankruptcy.
- Lordstown Endurance with Elaphe in-wheel motors, briefly produced in 2022 before its manufacturer filed for bankruptcy.

Planned production vehicles include:

- BMW Neue Klasse, planned for production in 2026 with in-wheel motors developed by DeepDrive.
- Renault 5 Turbo 3E, planned for production in 2027 with two 200 kW rear in-wheel motors.

== See also ==
- Active Wheel
- Direct-drive mechanism
- Hub-center steering
- Individual wheel drive
- Locking hubs
