= Lordstown, Ohio =

- Village
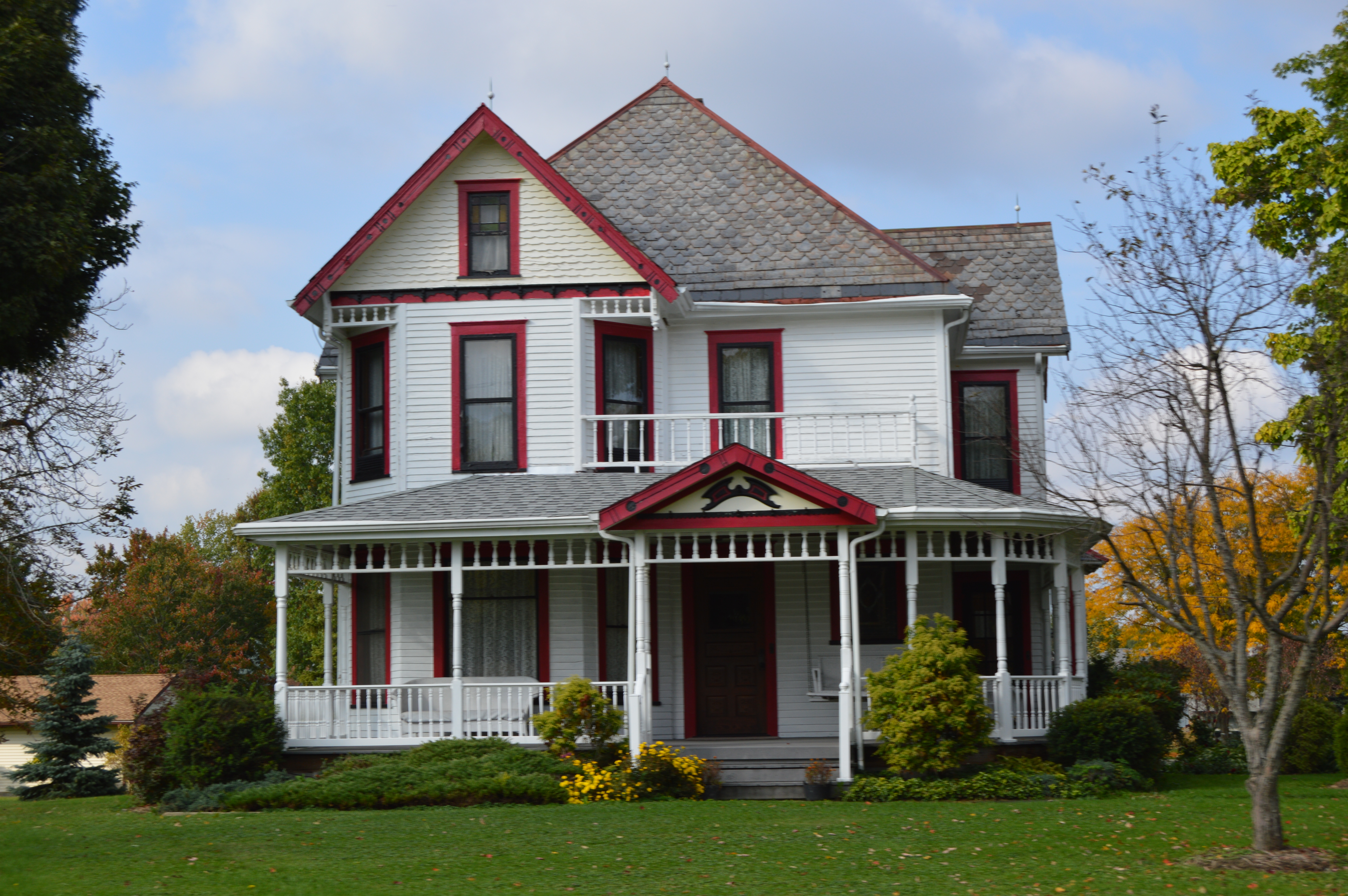
- The Almon G. McCorkle House, a historic site in the village
- Interactive map of Lordstown, Ohio
- Location within Ohio Location within the United States
- Coordinates: 41°10′07″N 80°52′28″W
- Country: United States
- State: Ohio
- County: Trumbull

Government
  - Type: Mayor-council
  - Body: Lordstown Village Council
  - Mayor: Jaclyn Woodward (D)
  - Council President: Jessica Blank (D)

Area
  - Total: 23.20 sq mi (60.08 km^{2})
  - Land: 23.19 sq mi (60.07 km^{2})
  - Water: 0.0039 sq mi (0.01 km^{2})
- Elevation: 951 ft (290 m)

Population (2020)
  - Total: 3,332
  - Density: 143.7/sq mi (55.47/km^{2})
- Time zone: UTC-5 (Eastern (EST))
  - Summer (DST): UTC-4 (EDT)
- ZIP code: 44481
- Area codes: 234/330
- FIPS code: 39-44912
- GNIS feature ID: 1087038
- Website: Village website

Lordstown is a village and paper township in southern Trumbull County, Ohio, United States. The population was 3,332 at the 2020 census. It is part of the Youngstown–Warren metropolitan area.

== History ==
Lordstown Township was one of the original survey townships of the Connecticut Western Reserve as Town 3, Range 4. It was named for Samuel P. Lord, who laid out the township. Except for a small section which was annexed to Warren Township, Lordstown Township nearly completely incorporated as the village of Lordstown in 1975.

== Geography ==
According to the United States Census Bureau, the village has a total area of 23.14 square miles (59.93 km^{2}), all land.

== Demographics ==
Historical population
Census	Pop.	Note	%±
1980	3,280		—
1990	3,404		3.8%
2000	3,633		6.7%
2010	3,417		−5.9%
2020	3,332		−2.5%
U.S. Decennial Census

=== 2020 census ===
As of the 2020 census, Lordstown had a population of 3,332. The median age was 49.1 years. 17.5% of residents were under the age of 18 and 26.1% of residents were 65 years of age or older. For every 100 females there were 93.2 males, and for every 100 females age 18 and over there were 93.4 males age 18 and over.

14.4% of residents lived in urban areas, while 85.6% lived in rural areas.

There were 1,434 households in Lordstown, of which 24.3% had children under the age of 18 living in them. Of all households, 51.0% were married-couple households, 18.0% were households with a male householder and no spouse or partner present, and 25.2% were households with a female householder and no spouse or partner present. About 25.8% of all households were made up of individuals and 13.5% had someone living alone who was 65 years of age or older.

There were 1,510 housing units, of which 5.0% were vacant. The homeowner vacancy rate was 0.8% and the rental vacancy rate was 4.1%.

Racial composition as of the 2020 census
Race	Number	Percent
White	3,052	91.6%
Black or African American	103	3.1%
American Indian and Alaska Native	8	0.2%
Asian	18	0.5%
Native Hawaiian and Other Pacific Islander	0	0.0%
Some other race	16	0.5%
Two or more races	135	4.1%
Hispanic or Latino (of any race)	55	1.7%

=== 2010 census ===
As of the census of 2010, there were 3,417 people, 1,391 households, and 1,025 families living in the village. The population density was 147.7 inhabitants per square mile (57.0/km^{2}). There were 1,496 housing units at an average density of 64.6 per square mile (24.9/km^{2}). The racial makeup of the village was 95.1% White, 3.2% African American, 0.1% Native American, 0.4% Asian, 0.1% from other races, and 1.1% from two or more races. Hispanic or Latino of any race were 0.9% of the population.

There were 1,391 households, of which 29.5% had children under the age of 18 living with them, 58.0% were married couples living together, 10.2% had a female householder with no husband present, 5.5% had a male householder with no wife present, and 26.3% were non-families. 22.1% of all households were made up of individuals, and 9.9% had someone living alone who was 65 years of age or older. The average household size was 2.46 and the average family size was 2.86.

The median age in the village was 45 years. 21.1% of residents were under the age of 18; 6.3% were between the ages of 18 and 24; 22.7% were from 25 to 44; 32.7% were from 45 to 64; and 17.2% were 65 years of age or older. The gender makeup of the village was 48.6% male and 51.4% female.

=== 2000 census ===
As of the census of 2000, there were 3,633 people, 1,412 households, and 1,077 families living in the village. The population density was 157.0 inhabitants per square mile (60.6/km^{2}). There were 1,483 housing units at an average density of 64.1 per square mile (24.7/km^{2}). The racial makeup of the village was 95.84% White, 2.89% African American, 0.08% Native American, 0.36% Asian, 0.11% from other races, and 0.72% from two or more races. Hispanic or Latino of any race were 0.44% of the population.

There were 1,412 households, out of which 32.2% had children under the age of 18 living with them, 63.7% were married couples living together, 9.0% had a female householder with no husband present, and 23.7% were non-families. 21.1% of all households were made up of individuals, and 7.6% had someone living alone who was 65 years of age or older. The average household size was 2.57 and the average family size was 2.97.

In the village, the population was spread out, with 24.0% under the age of 18, 7.1% from 18 to 24, 27.9% from 25 to 44, 30.0% from 45 to 64, and 11.0% who were 65 years of age or older. The median age was 40 years. For every 100 females there were 97.7 males. For every 100 females age 18 and over, there were 97.8 males.

The median income for a household in the village was $51,144, and the median income for a family was $55,305. Males had a median income of $45,082 versus $28,063 for females. The per capita income for the village was $22,683. About 5.6% of families and 4.4% of the population were below the poverty line, including 6.7% of those under age 18 and 6.4% of those age 65 or over.

== Economy ==
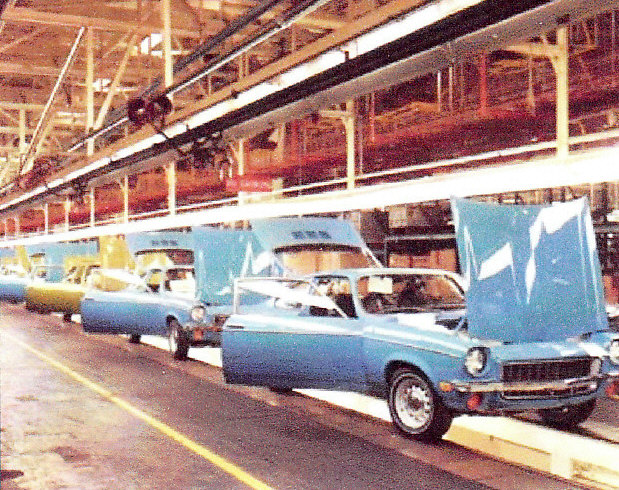
Production of the Chevrolet Vega at the Lordstown Assembly in 1972

Lordstown is best known as the home of the Lordstown Assembly, a former General Motors automotive plant that produced compact cars from 1966 until 2019. After the closure of Youngstown's steel factories, the Lordstown Assembly became the largest industrial employer of the Mahoning Valley region. Lordstown Motors purchased the assembly in November 2019. The factory was later sold to Foxconn in May 2022 for the production of electric vehicles. In 2025, Foxconn announced it is expected that the facility will be used to produce data center-related equipment for Stargate LLC.

Nu Ride Inc., an electric vehicle automaker formerly known as Lordstown Motors, is based in Lordstown. GM and LG Chem built a 30 GWh electric vehicle battery factory in the town, Ultium Cells LLC, which began production in August 2022. The village is also home to a TJX HomeGoods distribution center, as well as several smaller manufacturers. The Lordstown Energy Center is a 940 Megawatt combined-cycle natural-gas-fueled power plant in the village.

== Education ==
Lordstown Local School District operates one elementary school and Lordstown High School. Lordstown has a public library, a branch of the Warren-Trumbull County Public Library.

== Government ==
Lordstown operates under the Lordstown Village Council, which is composed of six members elected for staggered four-year terms. All six members are elected at-large. An independently elected mayor serves as an executive. As of 2026, the mayor is Jackie Woodward (D). The Mayor, the Clerk, and the Treasurer are all elected to four-year terms. There is additionally a three-member Board of Trustees of Public Affairs, all members of which are elected at-large for staggered four-year terms. All of Lordstown's municipal elections are conducted nonpartisanly.
