= DR4 =

DR4 may refer to:

- Death receptor 4, human protein
- HLA-DR4, human serotype
- Direct repeat 4, DNA sequence in the thyroid hormone response element recognized by the thyroid hormone receptor
- DR4, a badge-engineered variant of the Refine S3 car
