= JAC Heyue A30 =

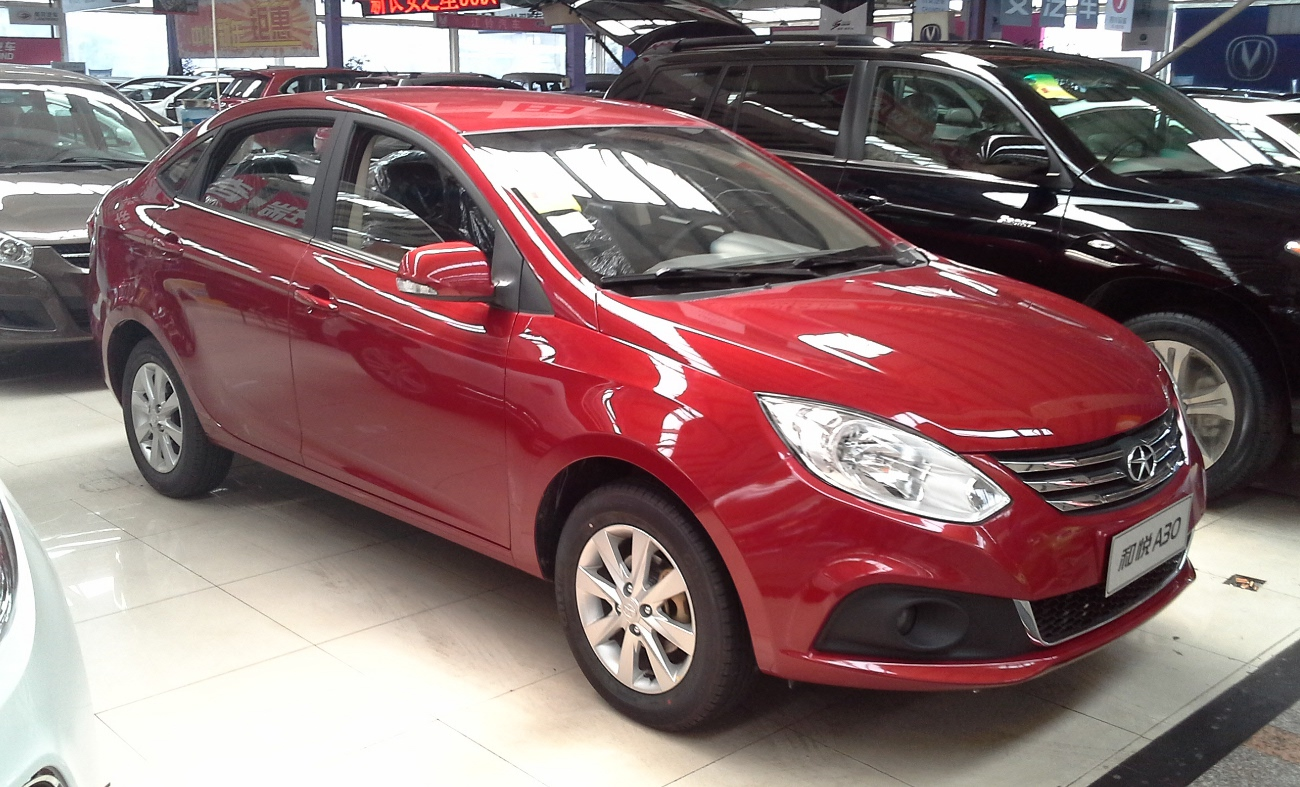

Overview
- Manufacturer: JAC Motors
- Also called: JAC BII; JAC J4; KMC Eagle (Iran)
- Production: 2012–2019; 2018–present (Iran)
- Model years: 2013–2019
- Assembly: Hefei, China; Ciudad Sahagún, Mexico; Kerman, Iran (KMC)

Body and chassis
- Class: Subcompact Sedan (B)
- Body style: 4-door sedan
- Related: JAC Heyue A20; JAC Refine S2

Powertrain
- Engine: 1.5 L I4 (petrol)
- Transmission: 5-speed manual CVT automatic

Dimensions
- Wheelbase: 2,560 mm (100.8 in)
- Length: 4,435 mm (174.6 in)
- Width: 1,725 mm (67.9 in)
- Height: 1,505 mm (59.3 in)

The JAC Heyue A30 is a subcompact sedan produced by JAC Motors that debuted on the 2012 Guangzhou Auto Show in China. Marketed as the JAC J4 in Latin America, the car is assembled in Mexico.

== Overview ==
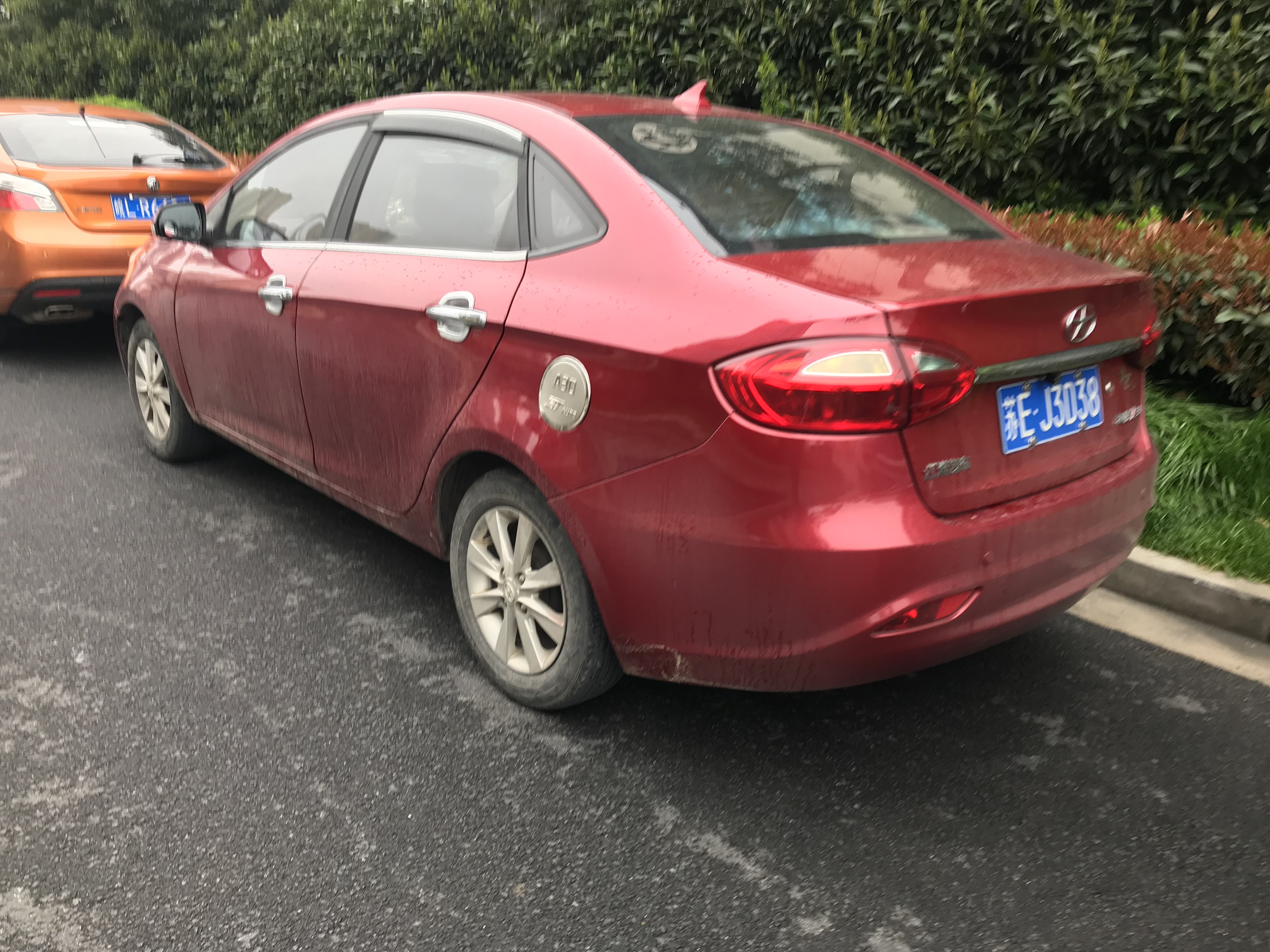
JAC Heyue A30 facelift rear

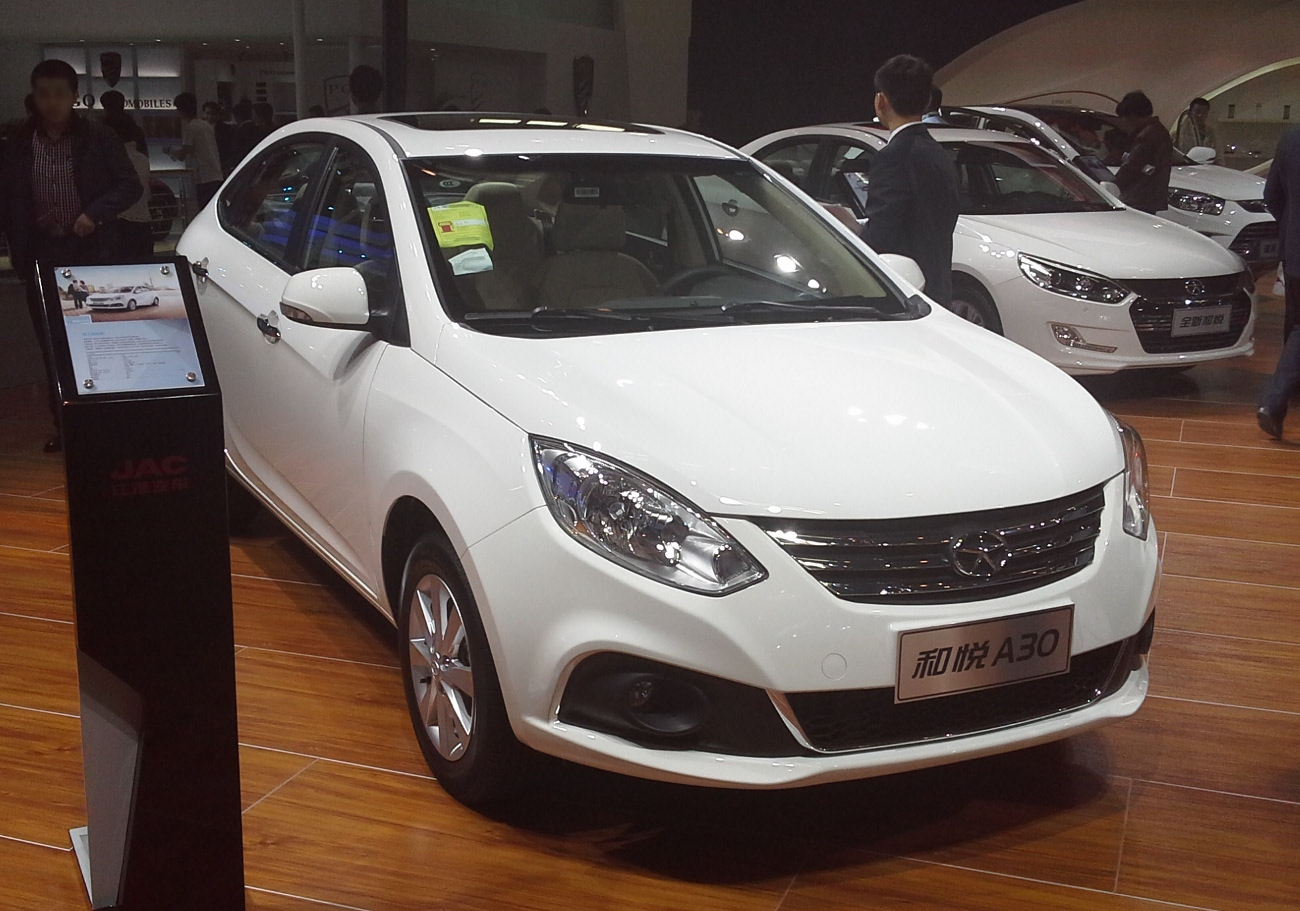

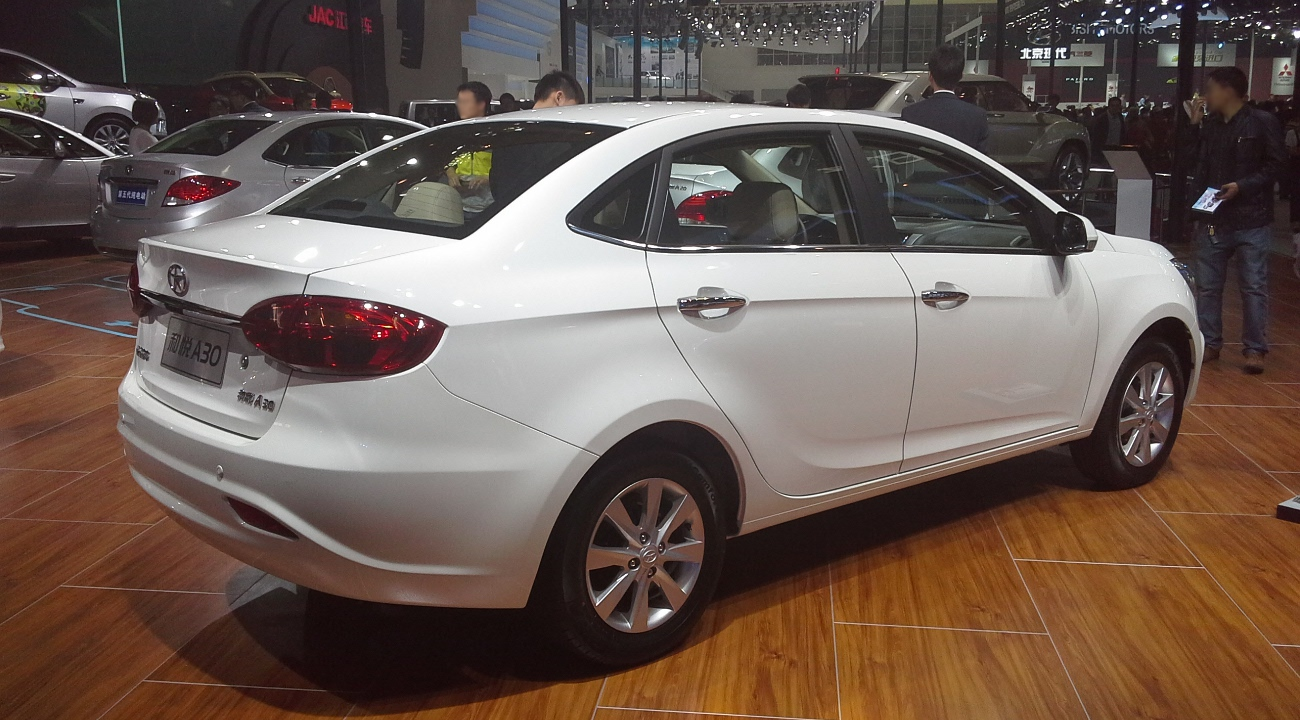
Pre-facelift JAC Heyue A30 Sedan

The Heyue A30 was powered by a 1.5 liter inline-four engine producing 83kW and 146Nm of torque, with transmission options being either a 5-speed manual gearbox or a CVT.

The final production version of the JAC Heyue A30 debuted at the 2013 Shanghai Auto Show, and it was planned to be launched on May 28, 2013, but was later postponed to November 2013 with prices ranging from 62,800 to 82,000 yuan.

The Heyue A30 was discontinued in 2016 with the last price range before discontinuation ranging from 52,900 yuan to 76,900 yuan.
