= JAC Refine S3 =

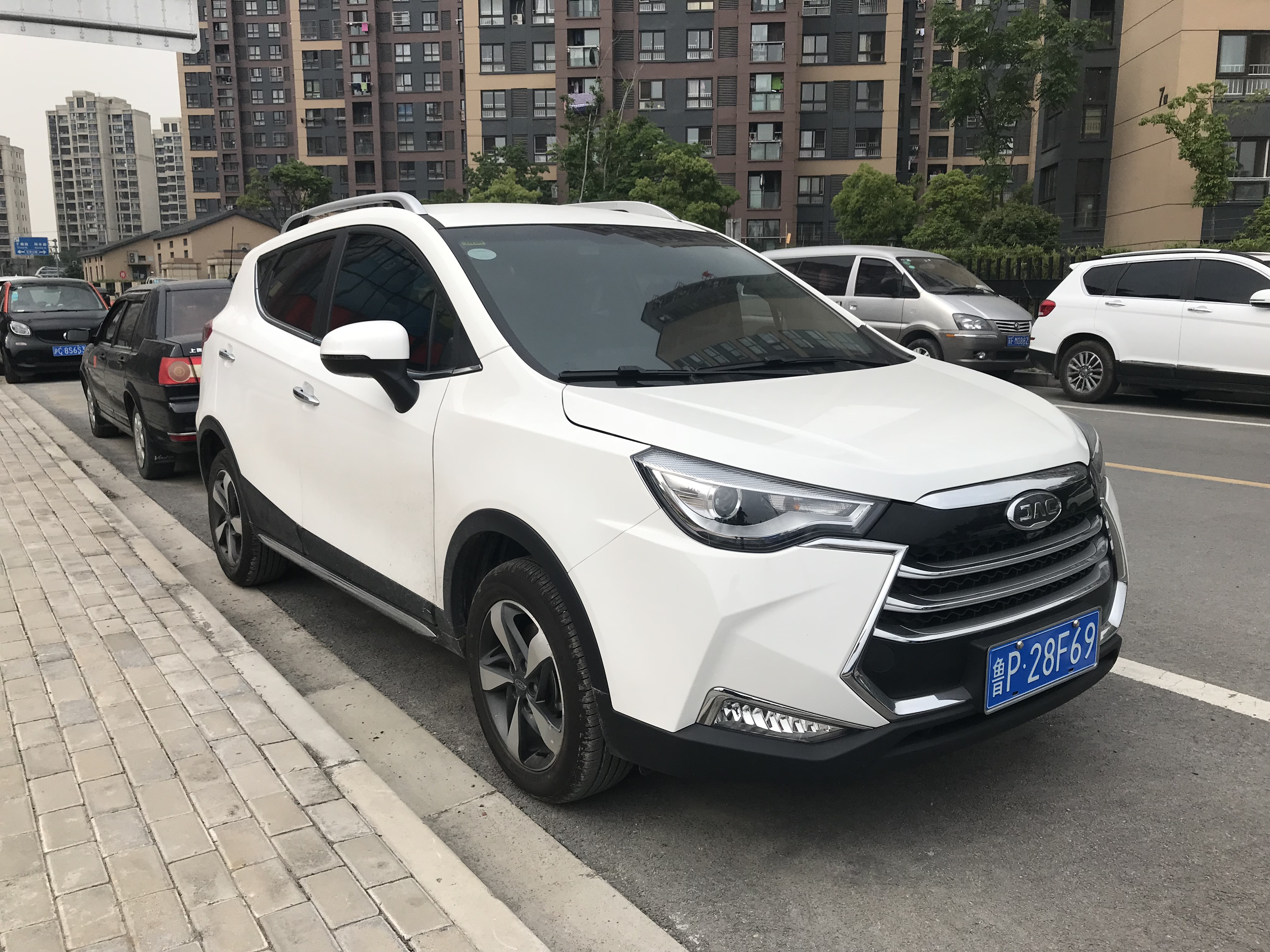

Overview
- Manufacturer: JAC Motors
- Also called: Heyue S30; DR4 (Italy, 2016–2020); EVO4 (Italy, 2020–Present); JAC S3 (Persian Gulf); JAC T50; JAC Sei 3 (Mexico); JAC JS3 (Egypt, Lebanon); KMC SR3 (Iran, 2025–Present)
- Production: 2013–Present
- Model years: 2013–Present
- Assembly: Hefei, China; Ciudad Sahagún, Mexico; Kerman, Iran (KMC)

Body and chassis
- Class: Compact crossover SUV
- Body style: 5-door station wagon
- Platform: Jianghuai B
- Related: JAC Heyue A30; JAC Refine S2

Powertrain
- Engine: 1.5 L I4 (petrol); 1.6 L I4 (petrol)
- Transmission: 5-speed manual Dual-clutch transmission CVT

Dimensions
- Wheelbase: 2,560 mm (100.8 in)
- Length: 4,325 mm (170.3 in); 4,345 mm (171.1 in) (2019 facelift)
- Width: 1,765 mm (69.5 in)
- Height: 1,660–1,685 mm (65.4–66.3 in); 1,640 mm (64.6 in) (2019 facelift)
- Curb weight: 1,255–1,275 kg (2,767–2,811 lb)

The JAC Refine S3 is a compact crossover SUV produced by JAC Motors under the Refine sub-brand.

== Overview ==
Originally launched on the 2013 Shanghai Auto Show as the Heyue S30 under the Heyue sub-brand, the compact crossover was quickly rebranded to Refine S3 shortly after during the 2014 Beijing Auto Show.

Pricing of the Refine S3 was revealed later during the 2014 Chengdu Auto Show with prices ranging from 65,800 yuan to 84,800 yuan. The JAC Refine S3 is powered by the HFC4GB2.3E 1.5 liter naturally aspirated engine producing 113 hp mated to a selection of 5-speed manual, 6-speed manual, and CVT gearboxes. The facelifted Refine S3 crossover was launched on the 2016 Chengdu Auto Show in China.

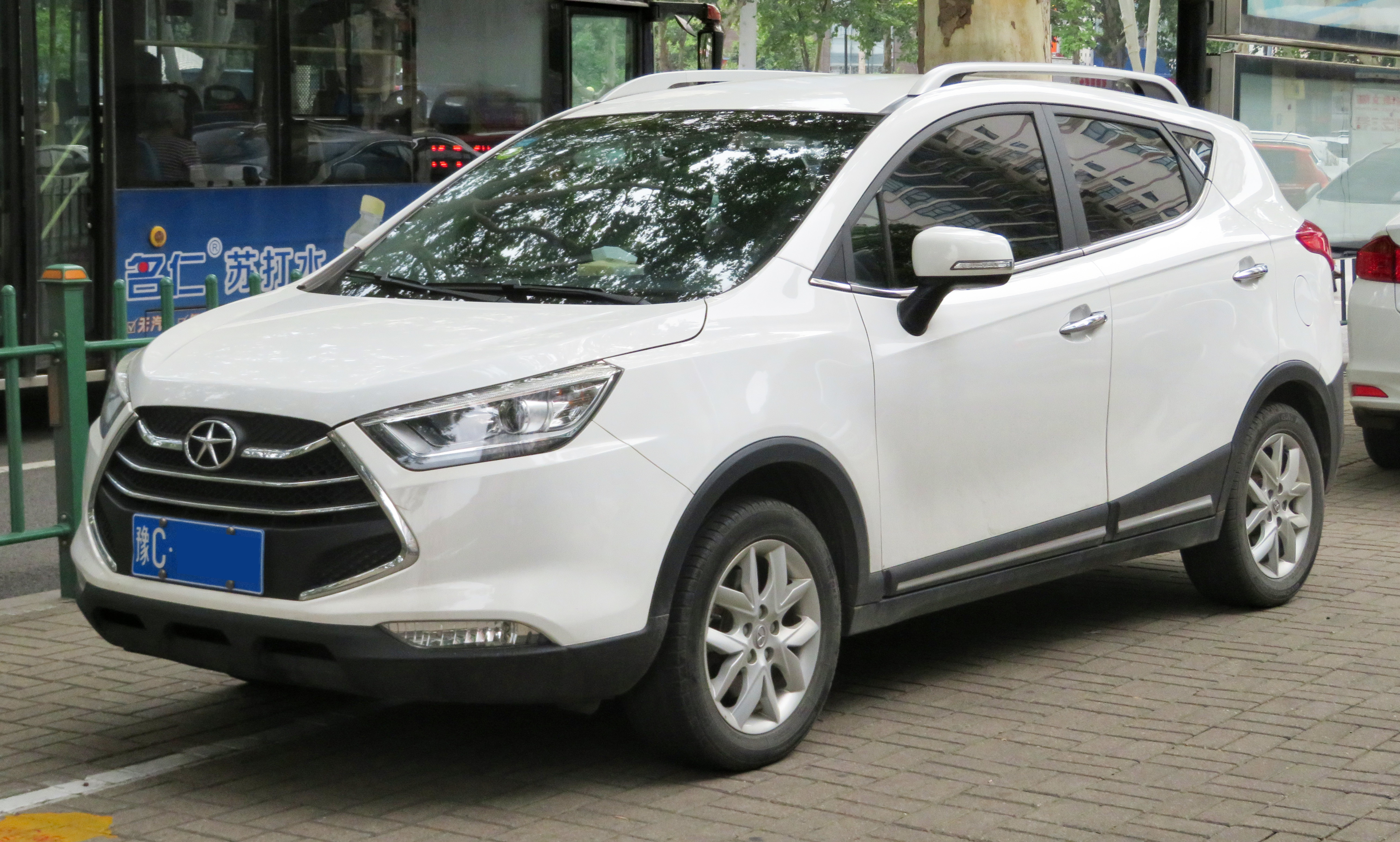
JAC S3 front (pre-facelift)

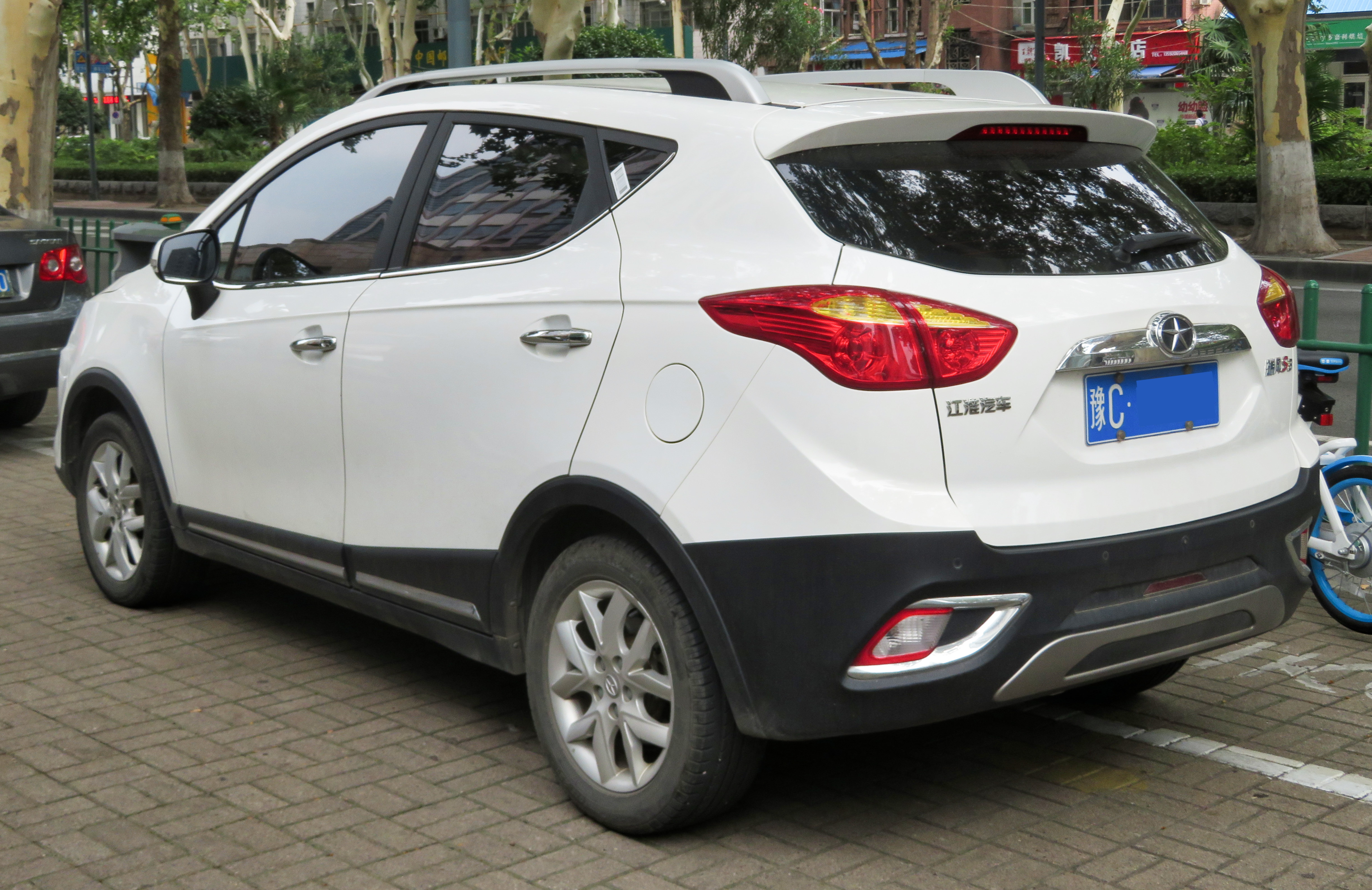
JAC S3 rear (pre-facelift)

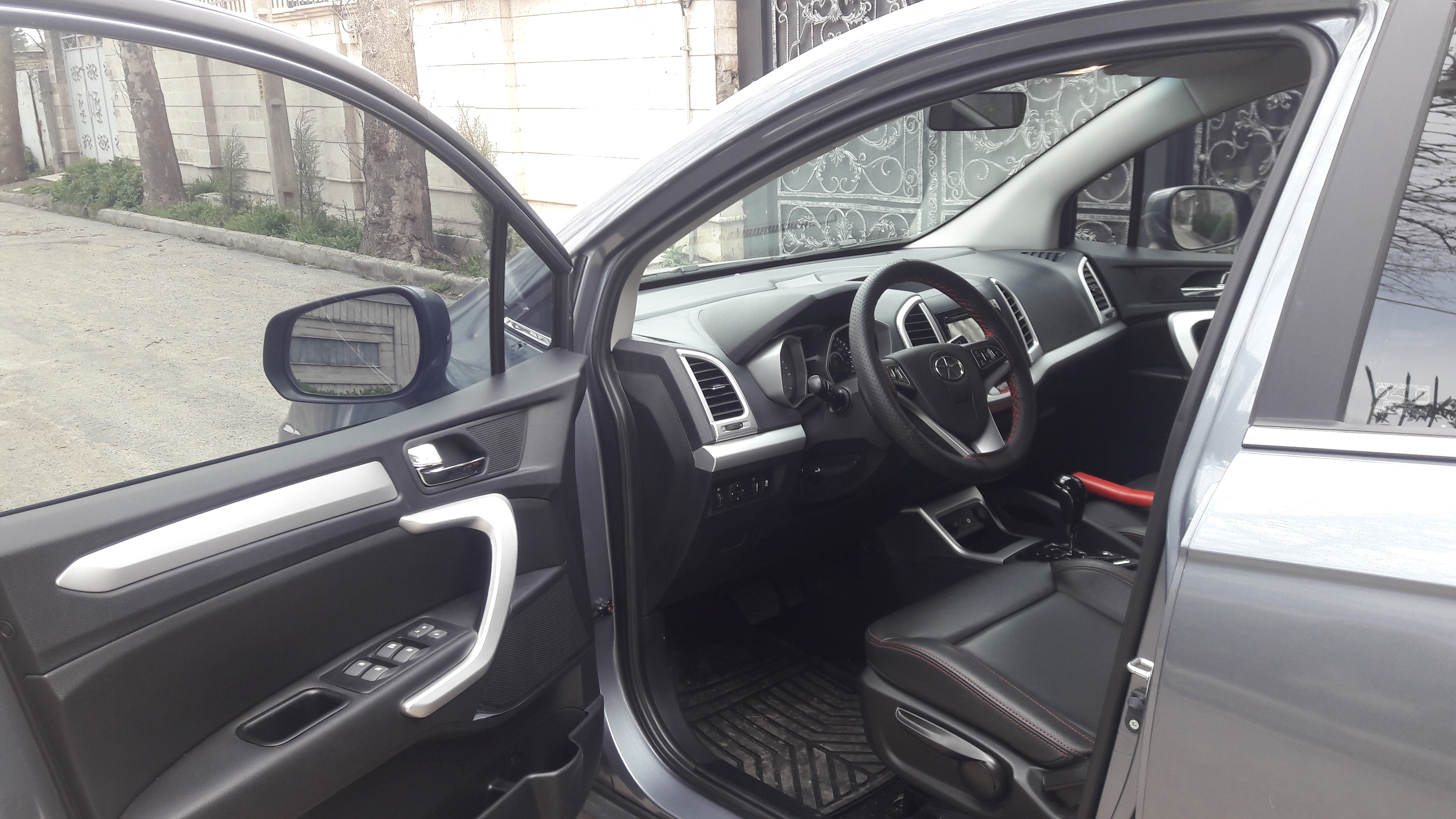
JAC S3 interior (pre-facelift)

=== 2016 facelift ===
The 2016 facelift includes redesigned grilles, triangle shaped fog lights, new headlights, new rear lights, new bumpers, and an updated interior. It also introduces the new JAC corporate logo.

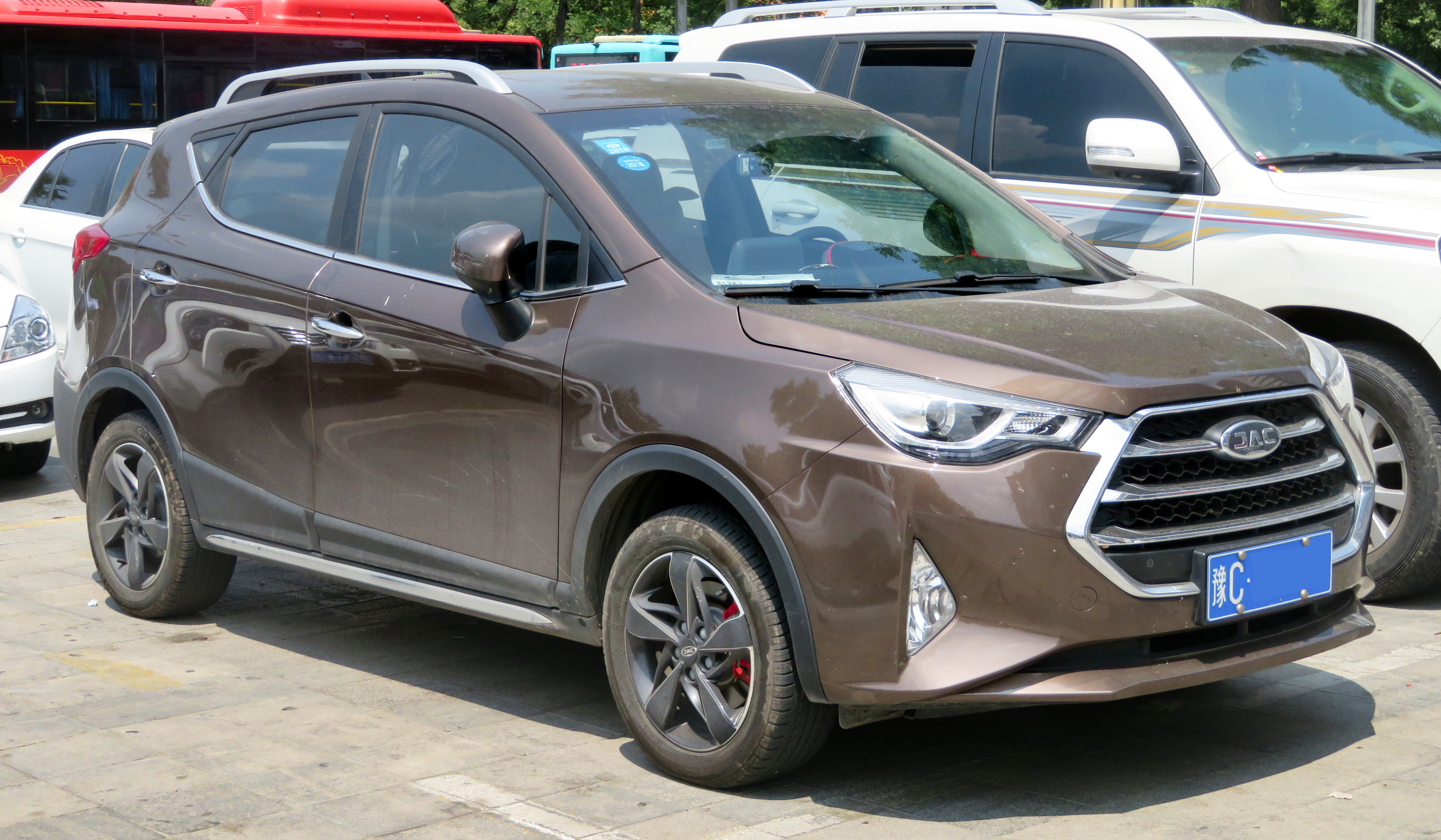
JAC S3 (facelift)

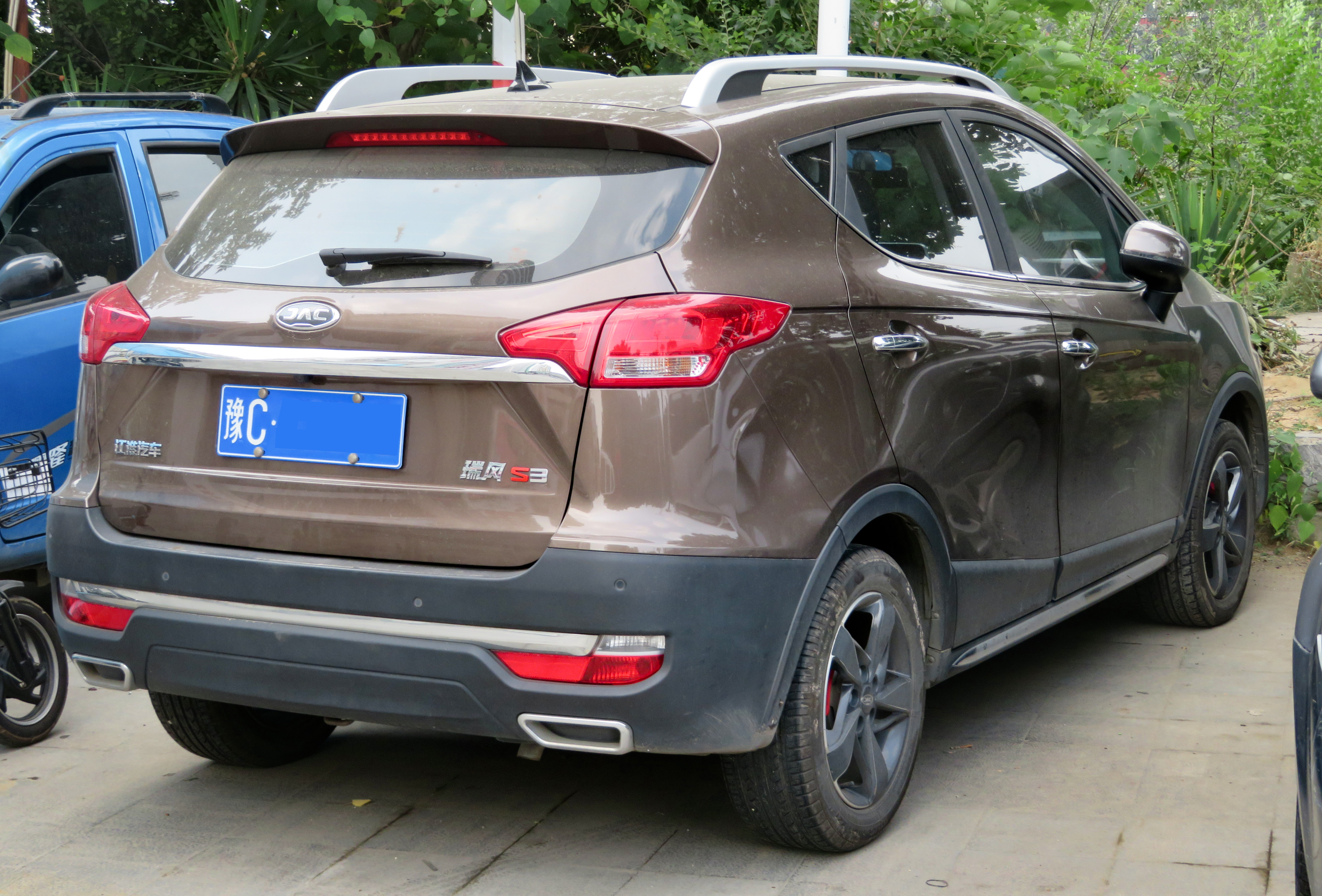
JAC S3 rear (facelift)

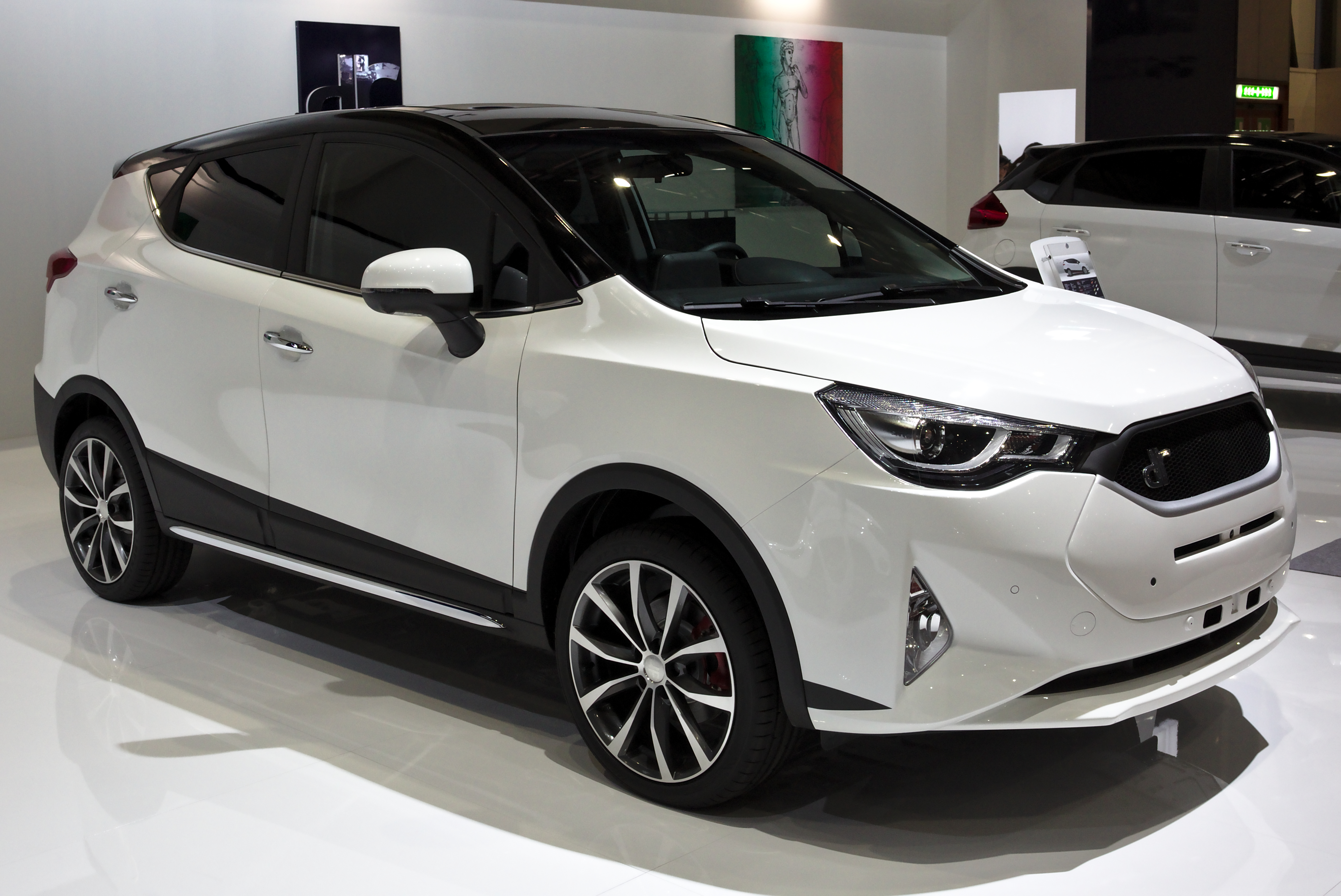
DR 4

=== 2019 facelift ===
At the 2019 Shanghai Auto Show, JAC Motors released the redesigned 2019 JAC Refine S3. The 2019 facelift features a redesigned front fascia and a restyled rear bumper resulting in a 20mm increase in the vehicle length. The interior of 2019 model has also been adjusted with the floating central control large screen greatly improved with enhanced visual effect. The instrument panel display is double-cylinder design with high display resolution and adjustable brightness.

The 2019 JAC Refine S3 is powered by the same HFC4GB2.3E 1.5 liter naturally aspirated engine producing 114 hp, and equipped with a large speed ratio gearbox for higher transmission efficiency.

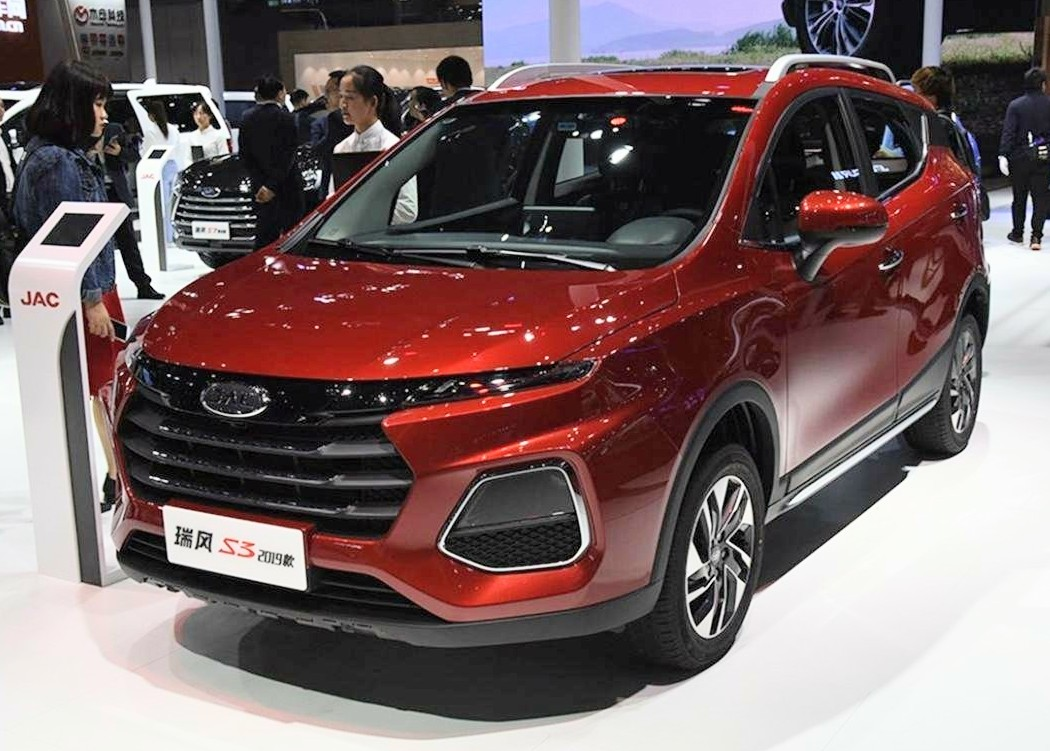
JAC Refine S3 front (2019 facelift)

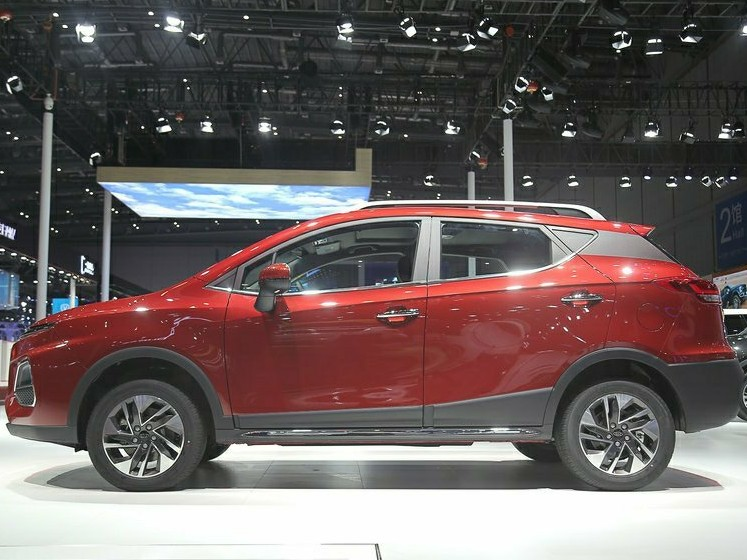
JAC Refine S3 side (2019 facelift)

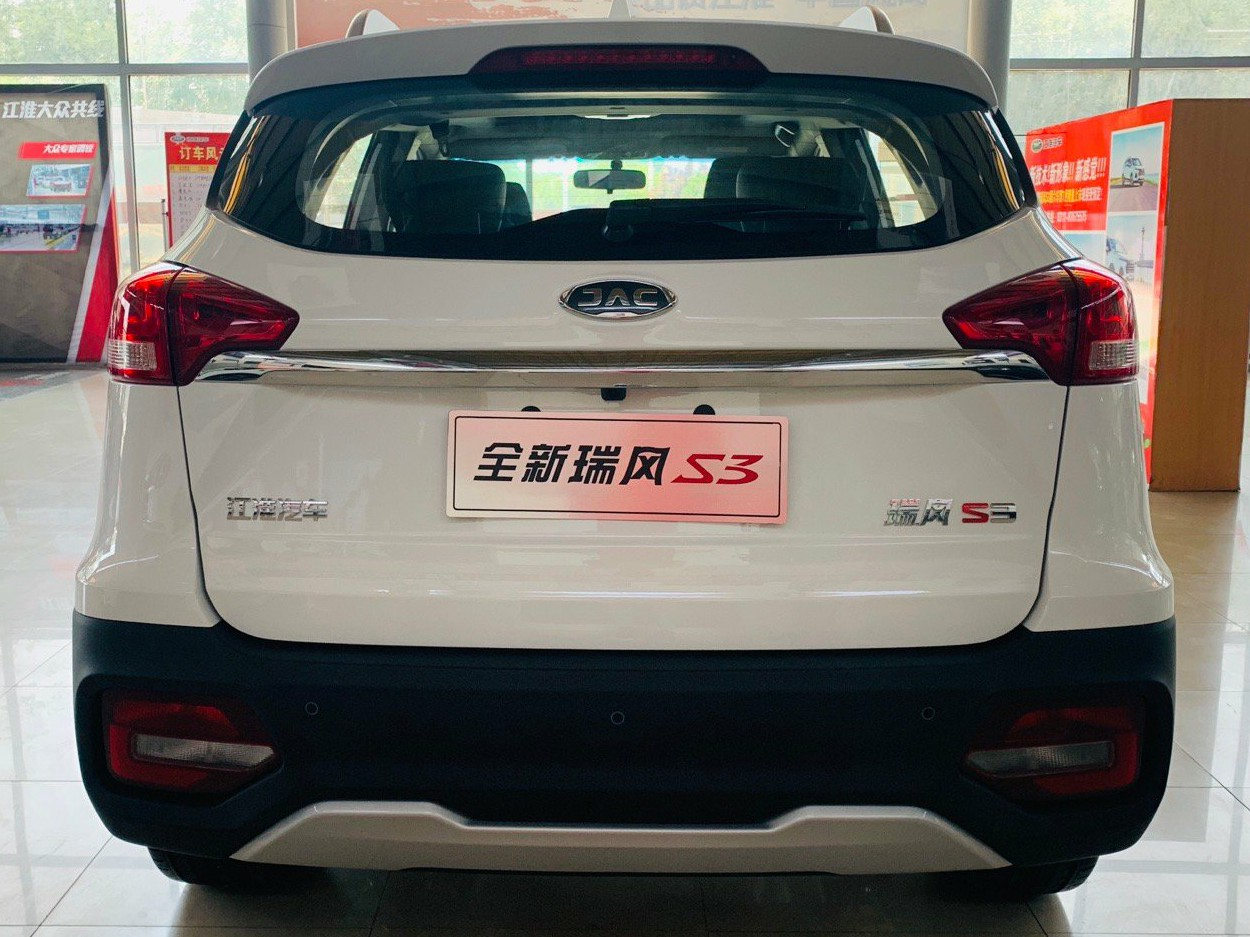
JAC Refine S3 rear (2019 facelift)

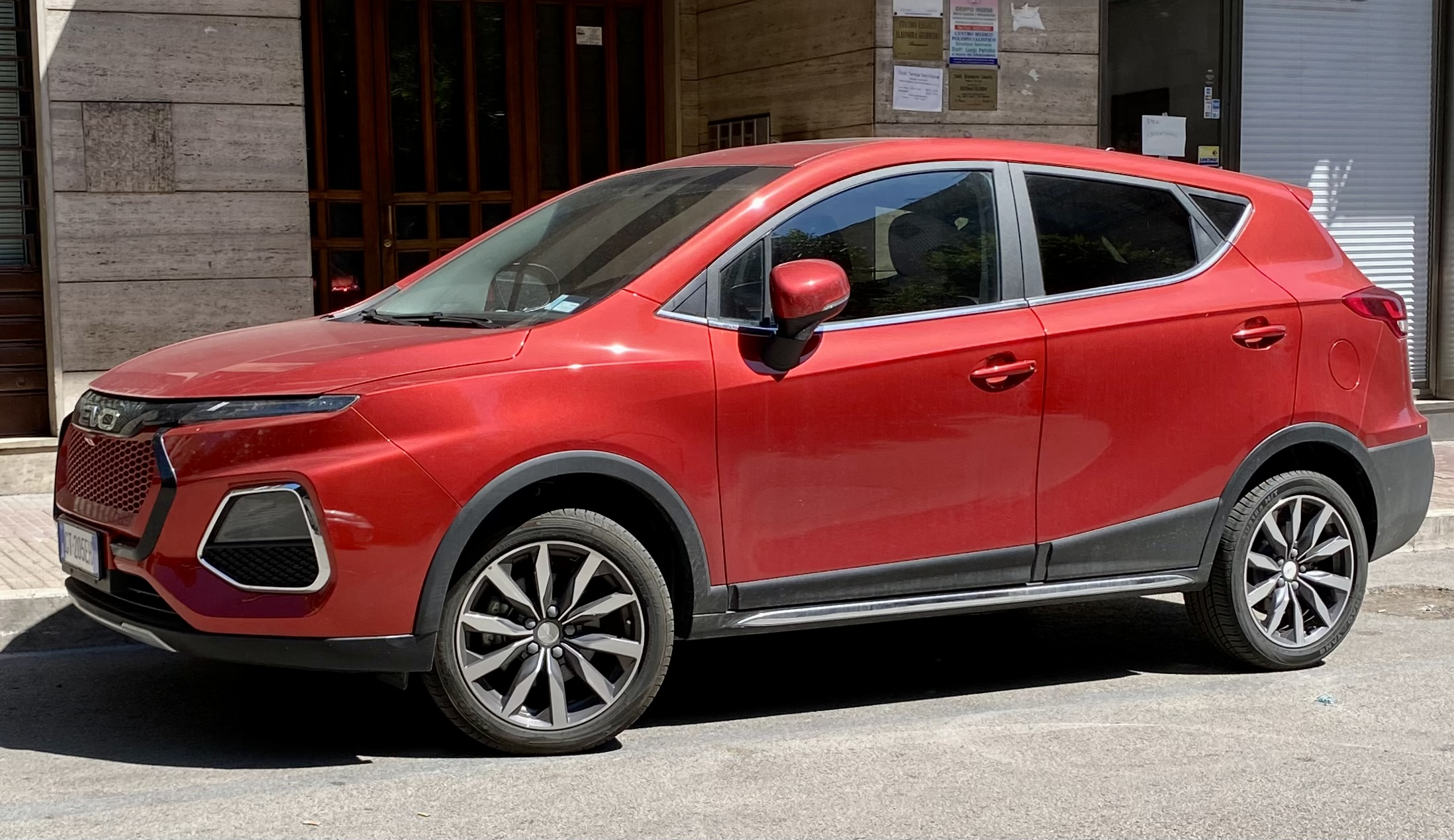
EVO 4
