= XEV =

Italian-Hong Kong electric car manufacturer

XEV Ltd
- Founded: 2016
- Headquarters: Turin, Italy; Hong Kong,
- Area served: Europe and the Middle East
- Key people: Tik Lou (president); Paul Zhu (director)
- Number of employees: 150 (2021)
- Website: www.xev-global.com

XEV Ltd (short for X-Electrical Vehicle or Xianggang Electric Vehicle) is an Italian-Hong Kong electric microcar manufacturer based in Hong Kong, operating since 2016.

XEV employees alleged in April 2024 on the company's official social media account that the company has been insolvent since early 2024 and unable to pay its employees and suppliers. XEV denied these claims.

== History ==
In 2016, a Chinese engineer and entrepreneur, Tik Lou, engaged a team of native collaborators, as well as those experienced in, among others, in the then FCA group of designers. As a result, the automotive startup XEV was created, choosing Hong Kong as its headquarters, with a styling office located in Turin, Italy.

With the start of operations, XEV focused on the development of its project, an electric microcar with elements made in a 3D printer, collecting initial funding thanks to European funds. In 2019, the company announced that its vehicle would be manufactured at its newly acquired plant in Shanghai, China.

A pre-production XEV car was unveiled in December 2019, with plans to start series production in August 2020 if the necessary funds are raised through a crowdfunding campaign. The final model finally debuted in September 2021, in the same month not only going into production, but also having a world debut at the IAA 2021 show in Munich.

== Models ==
=== Currently in production ===
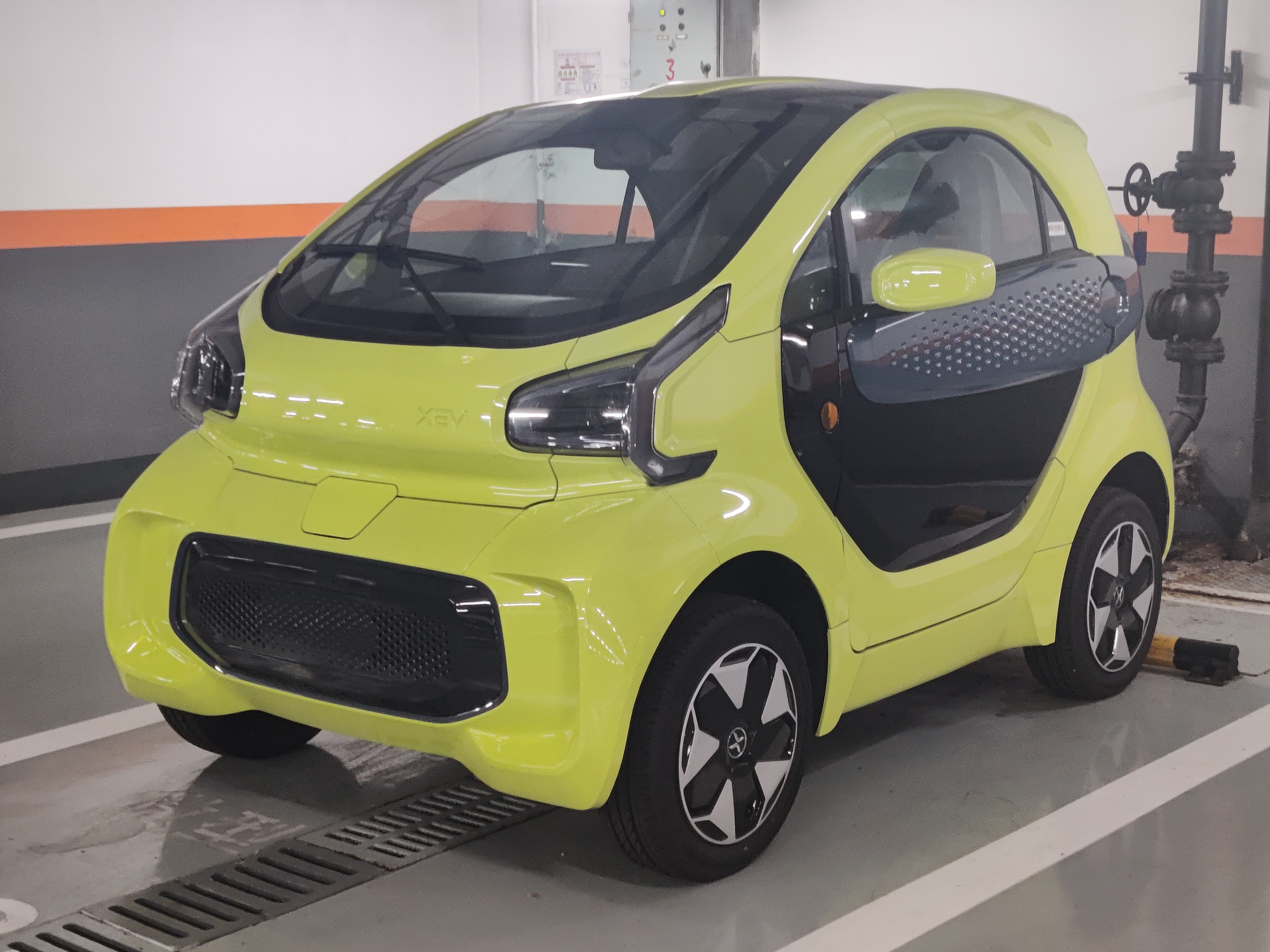
XEV Yoyo

- Yoyo
- Kitty

=== Out of production ===
- iEV7s
