= XEV Yoyo =

Chinese electric quadricycle

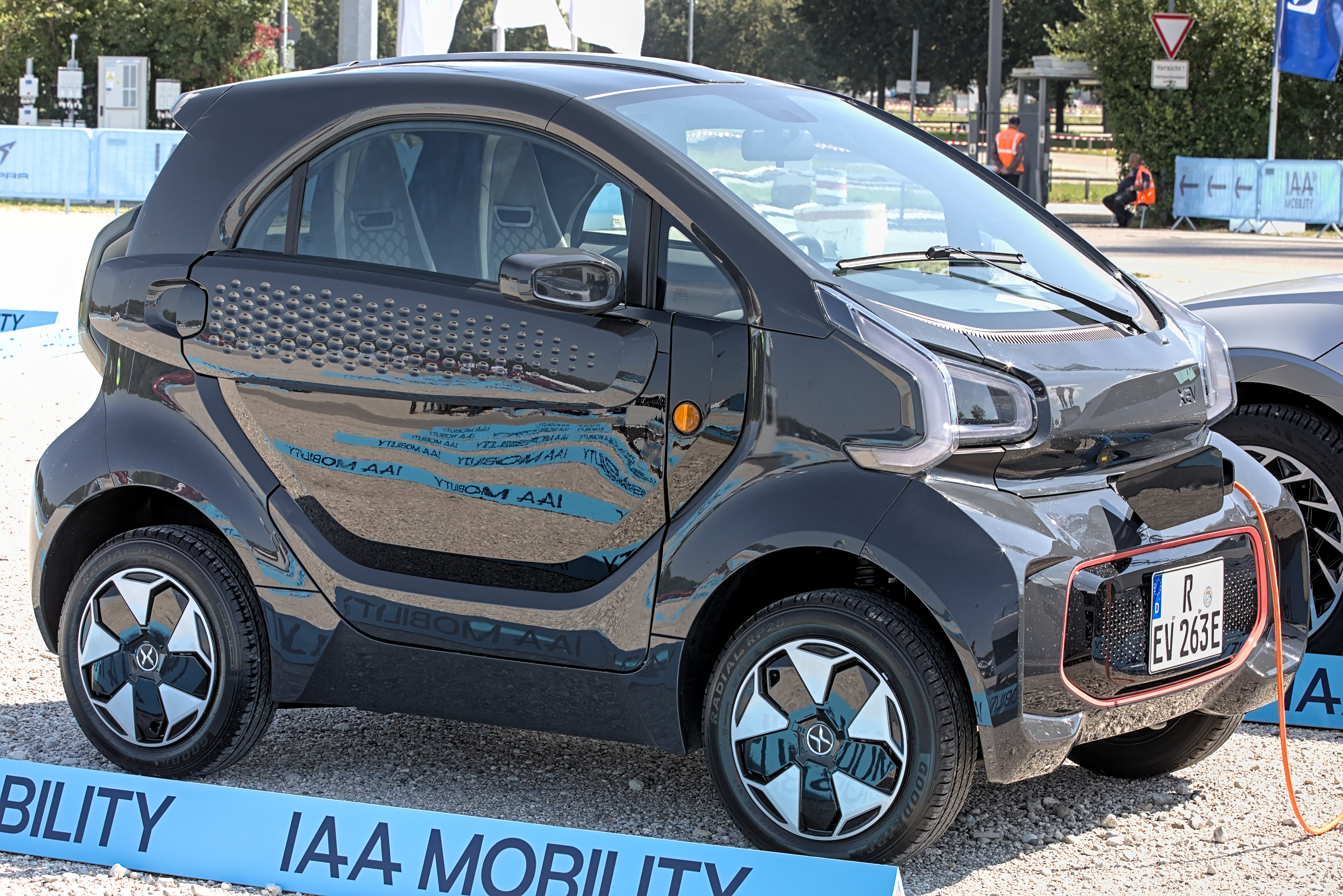

Overview
- Manufacturer: XEV
- Also called: XEV LSEV (concept car)
- Production: 2021–present
- Assembly: China: Shanghai (Shandong Fulu Vehicle Industry Co., Ltd.)

Body and chassis
- Class: Quadricycle
- Body style: 2-door hatchback

Powertrain
- Electric motor: 15 kW (20 hp)
- Battery: 10.3 kWh
- Range: 150 km (93.2 mi)

Dimensions
- Wheelbase: 1,680 mm (66.1 in)
- Length: 2,530 mm (99.6 in)
- Width: 1,500 mm (59.1 in)
- Height: 1,560 mm (61.4 in)
- Curb weight: 850 kg (1,874 lb)

The XEV Yoyo is an electric city car manufactured by Italian–Hong Kong-based startup XEV.

The Yoyo was designed in Turin Italy and manufactured in China. It is an L7e category and is primarily intended for use in urban areas.

It has a replaceable battery pack, accessible from the rear bumper, that allows for rapid swapping of batteries that saves time compared to plug-in charging. It also has a front mounted charging port for use with both home plug and type two chargers.

It has a top speed of 89 km/h (55 mph) and a maximum range of 150 km (93 mi).

== Overview ==
XEV designed this car using only 57 components. The only parts that are not 3D printed are the chassis, seats and glass components. The 3D printing materials used include enhanced nylon, polylactic acid, and thermoplastic polyurethane.

The production model was presented for the first time in September 2021 at the IAA in Munich, and was also exhibited at the 2022 Paris Motor Show. It has interchangeable batteries.

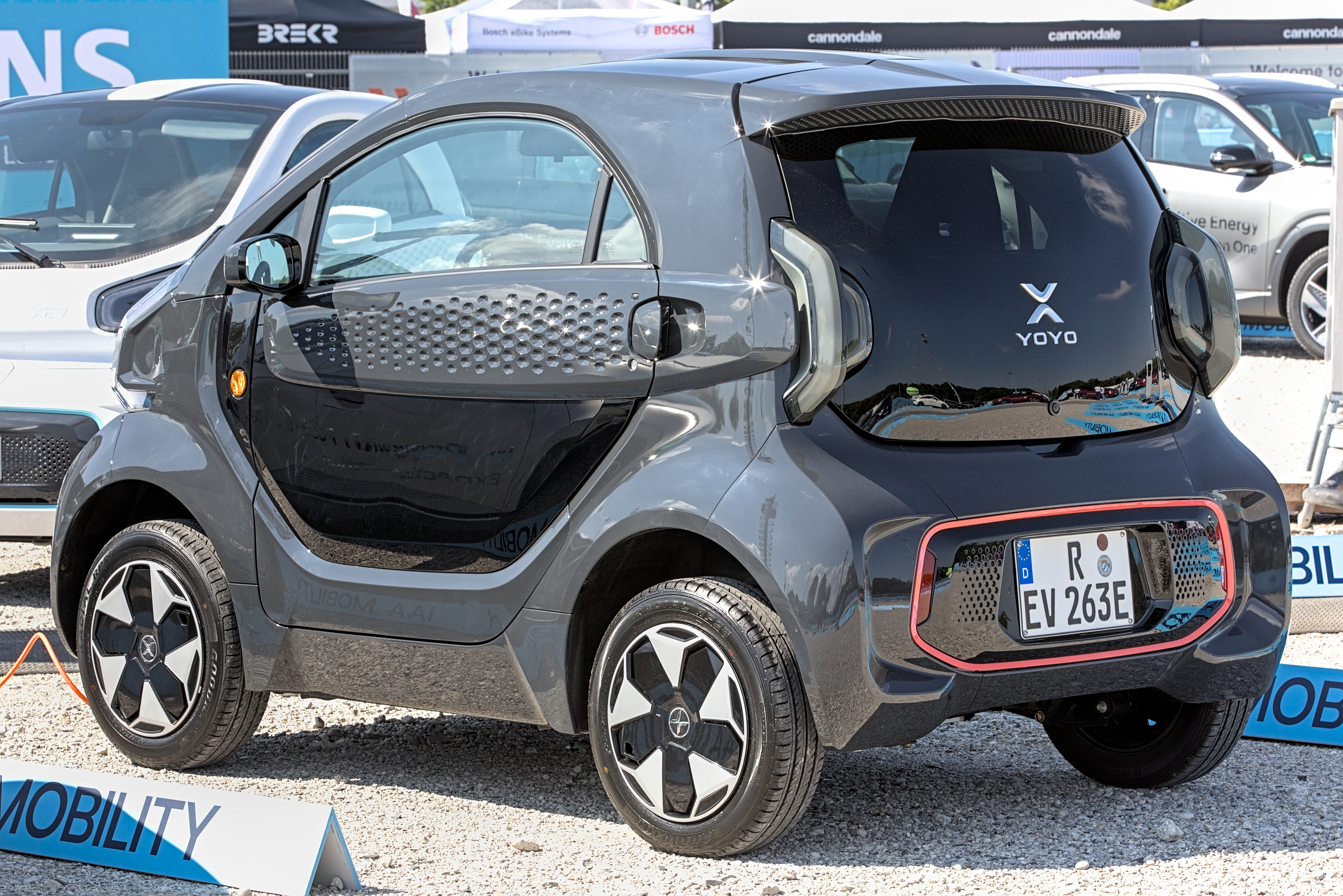
Rear view

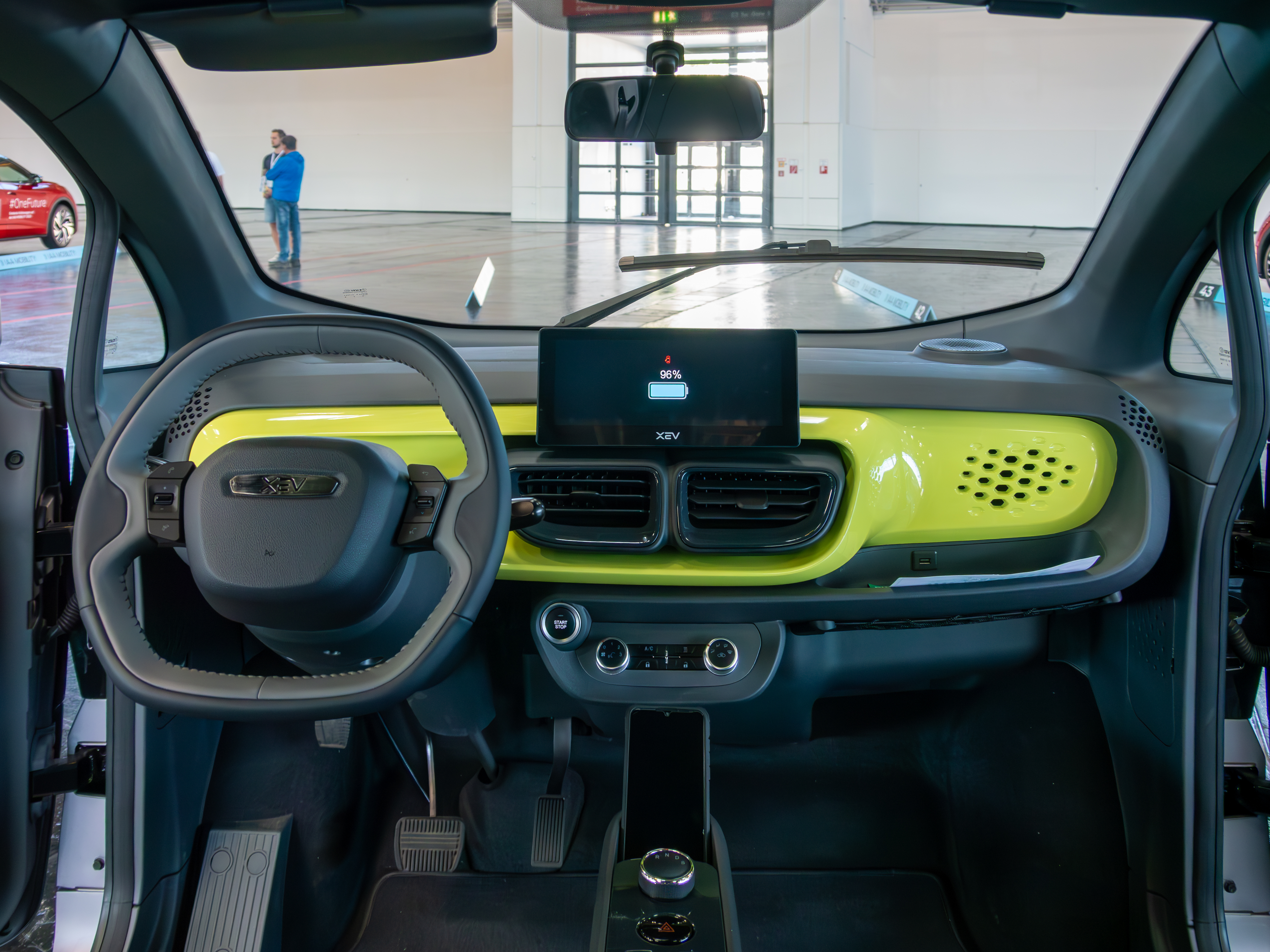
Interior

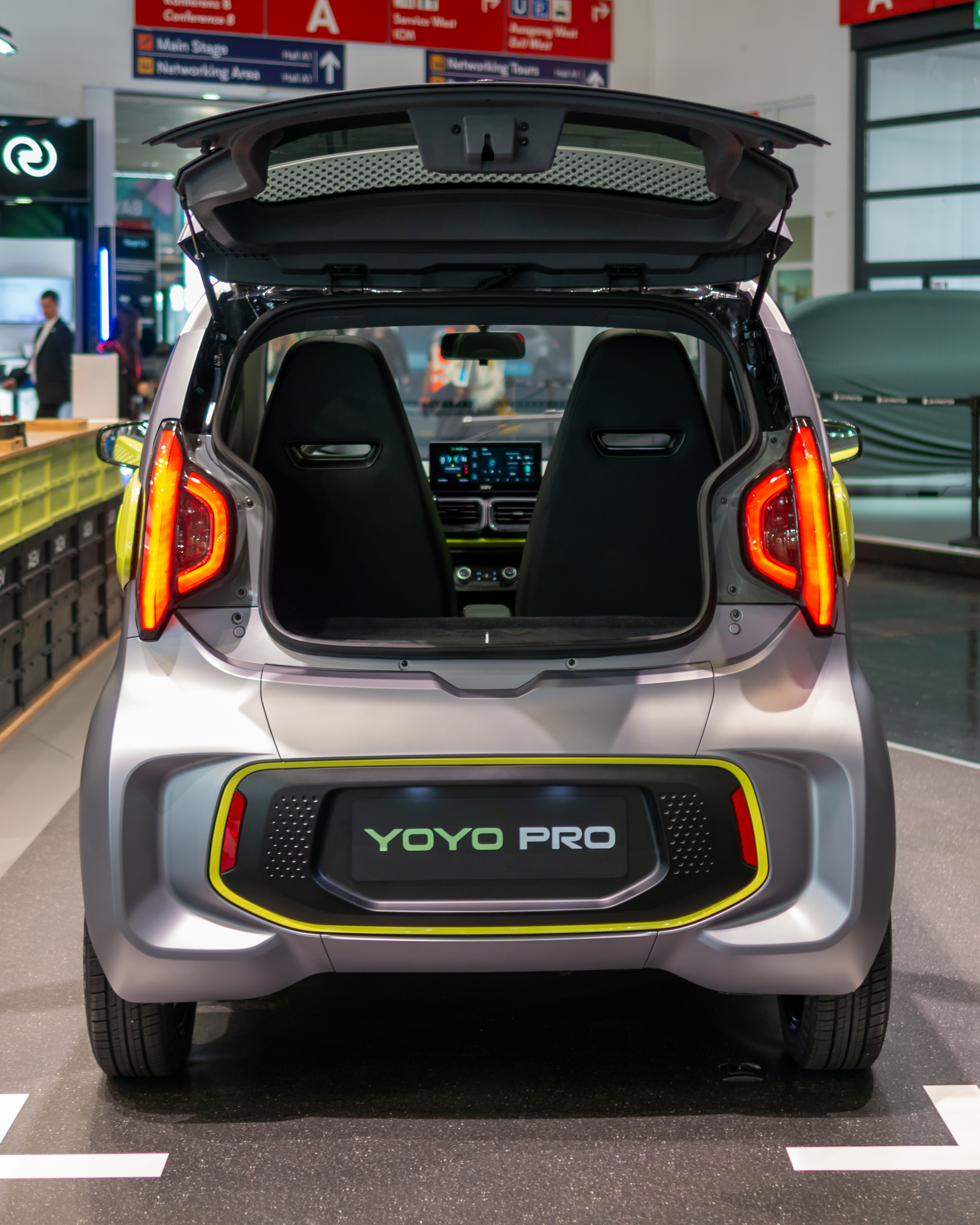
Rear hatch
