= JAC Heyue A20 =

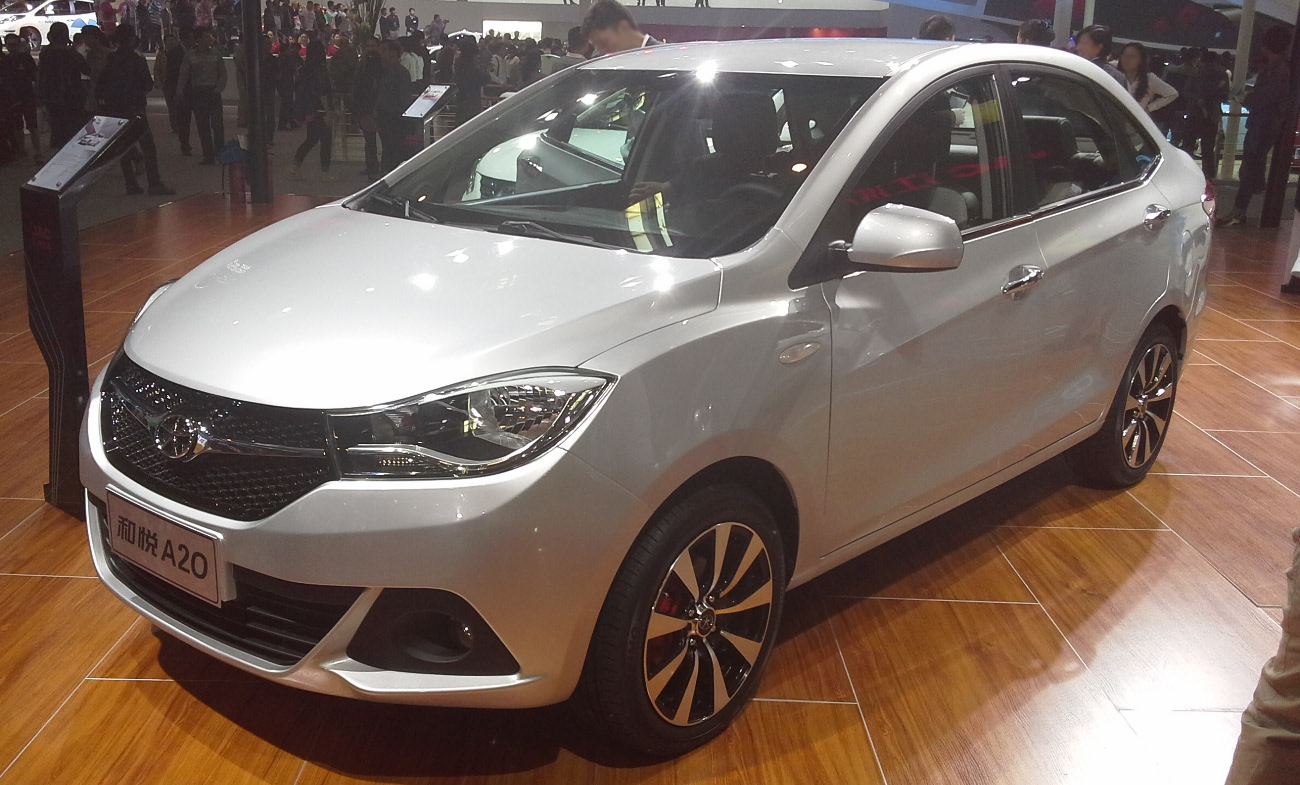

Overview
- Manufacturer: JAC Motors
- Also called: JAC iEV7; JAC iEV; JAC iEV5
- Production: 2013–2014; 2014–2016 (iEV); 2016–present (iEV7)
- Model years: 2013–2014; 2014–2016 (iEV); 2016–2022 (iEV7)

Body and chassis
- Class: Subcompact car (B)
- Body style: 4-door sedan
- Related: Heyue A30

Powertrain
- Engine: 1.3 L I4 (petrol); 1.5 L I4 (petrol)
- Transmission: 5-speed manual CVT automatic

Dimensions
- Wheelbase: 2,490 mm (98.0 in)
- Length: 4,250 mm (167.3 in)
- Width: 1,690 mm (66.5 in)
- Height: 1,505 mm (59.3 in)

The JAC Heyue A20 in China, is a subcompact car produced by JAC Motors that debuted on the 2013 Shanghai Auto Show.

== Overview ==
The Heyue A20 is positioned under the JAC Heyue S30 sedan that also debuted on the 2013 Shanghai Auto Show. The production version of the JAC Heyue A20 will start in September 2013 and it was available to the Chinese car market in December 2013, with prices start from around 55,000 yuan.

The Heyue A20 sedan is powered by 1.3 liter and 1.5 liter four-cylinder engines. The 1.5 liter engine produces 113hp and 146nm.

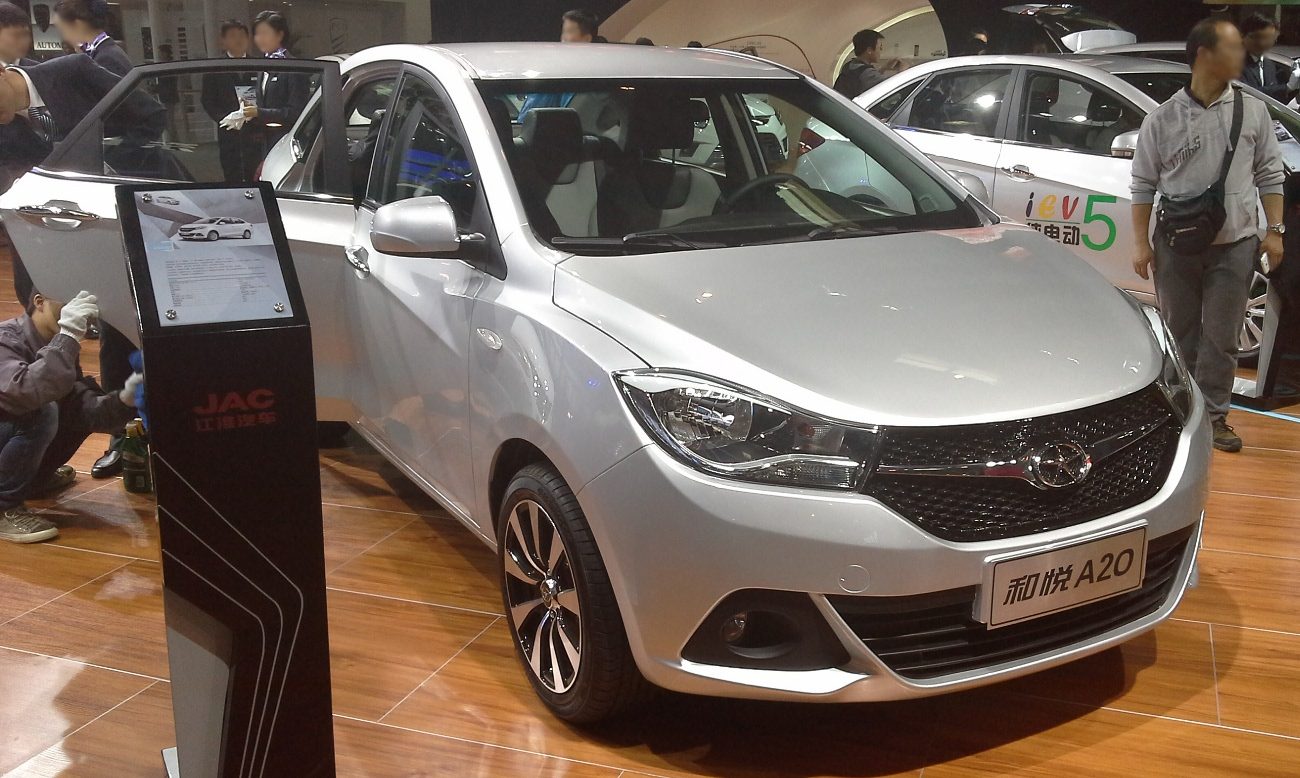
JAC Heyue A20 Sedan

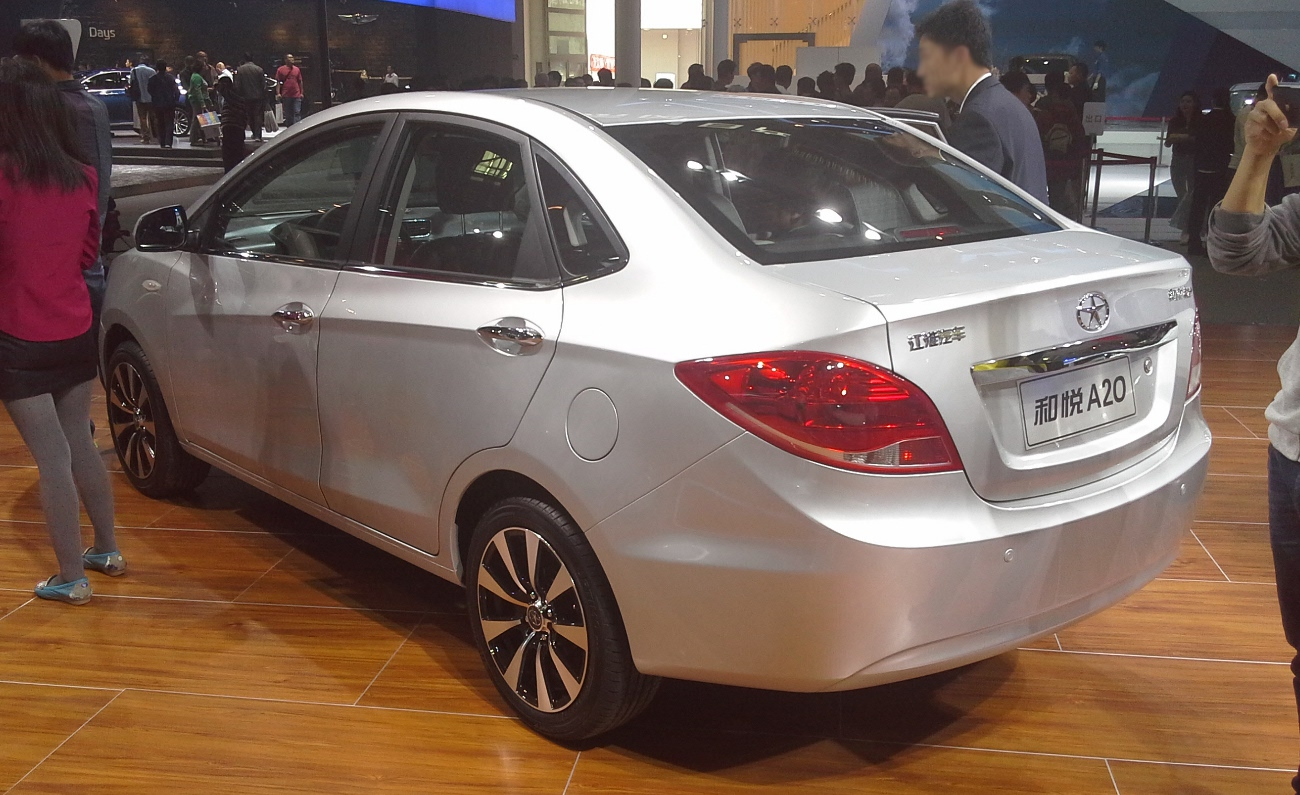
JAC Heyue A20 Sedan

== JAC iEV7 ==
The JAC iEV, JAC iEV7 or JAC iEV7L is the electric version of the Heyue A20. Originally planned to be called the JAC iEV5 during the launch on the 2014 Beijing Auto Show, the electric subcompact sedan was later renamed to JAC iEV, and was sold until 2016. The vehicle was sold as the JAC iEV7 starting from 2017. The JAC iEV7 name was also used on the electric version of the JAC Heyue A60 before production, but the name was dropped before the iEV.

The JAC iEV7 was powered by an electric motor with an output of 67hp and 215nm of torque. Power comes from a 70aH lithium-ion battery.

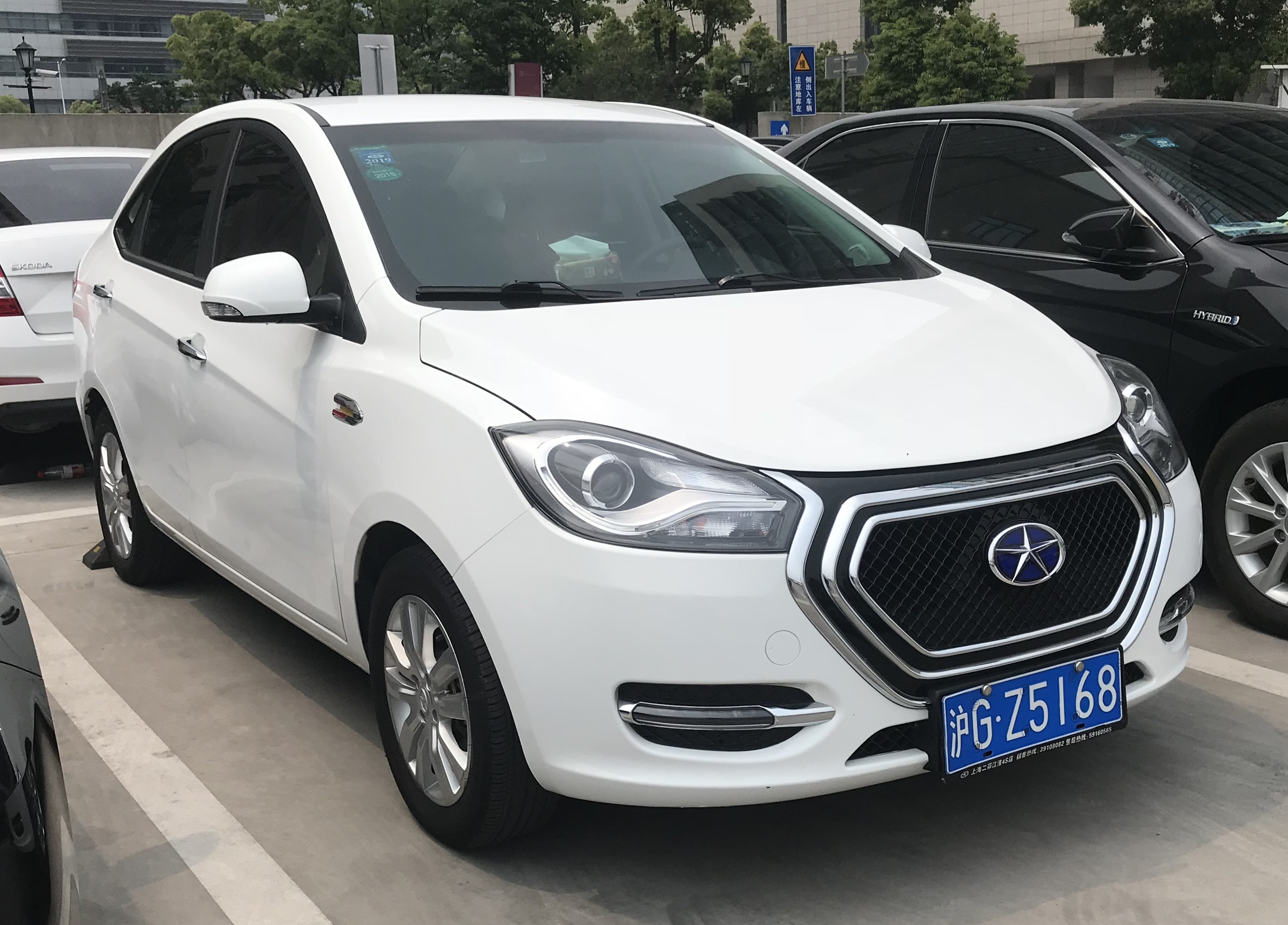
JAC iEV Sedan

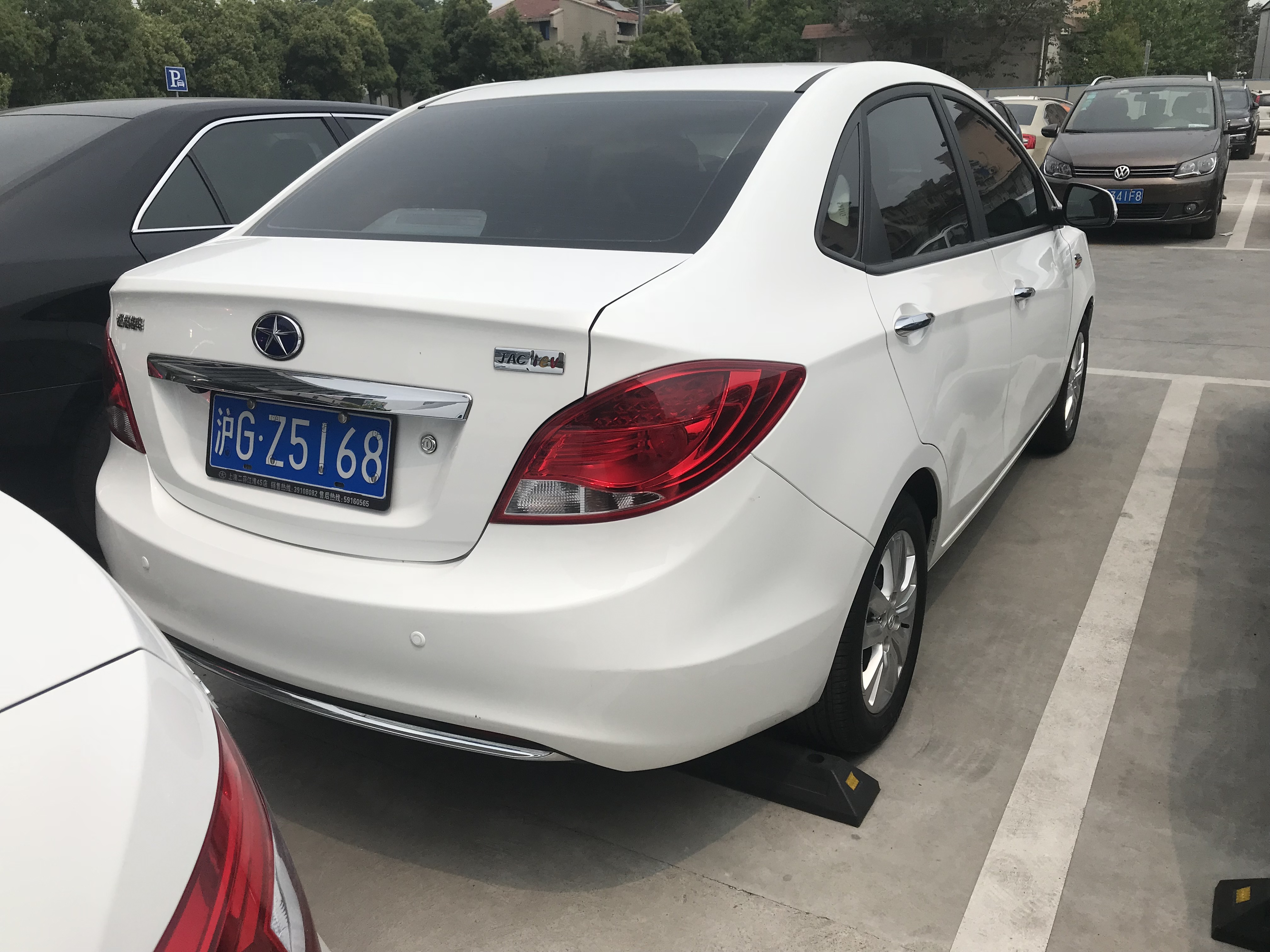
JAC iEV Sedan

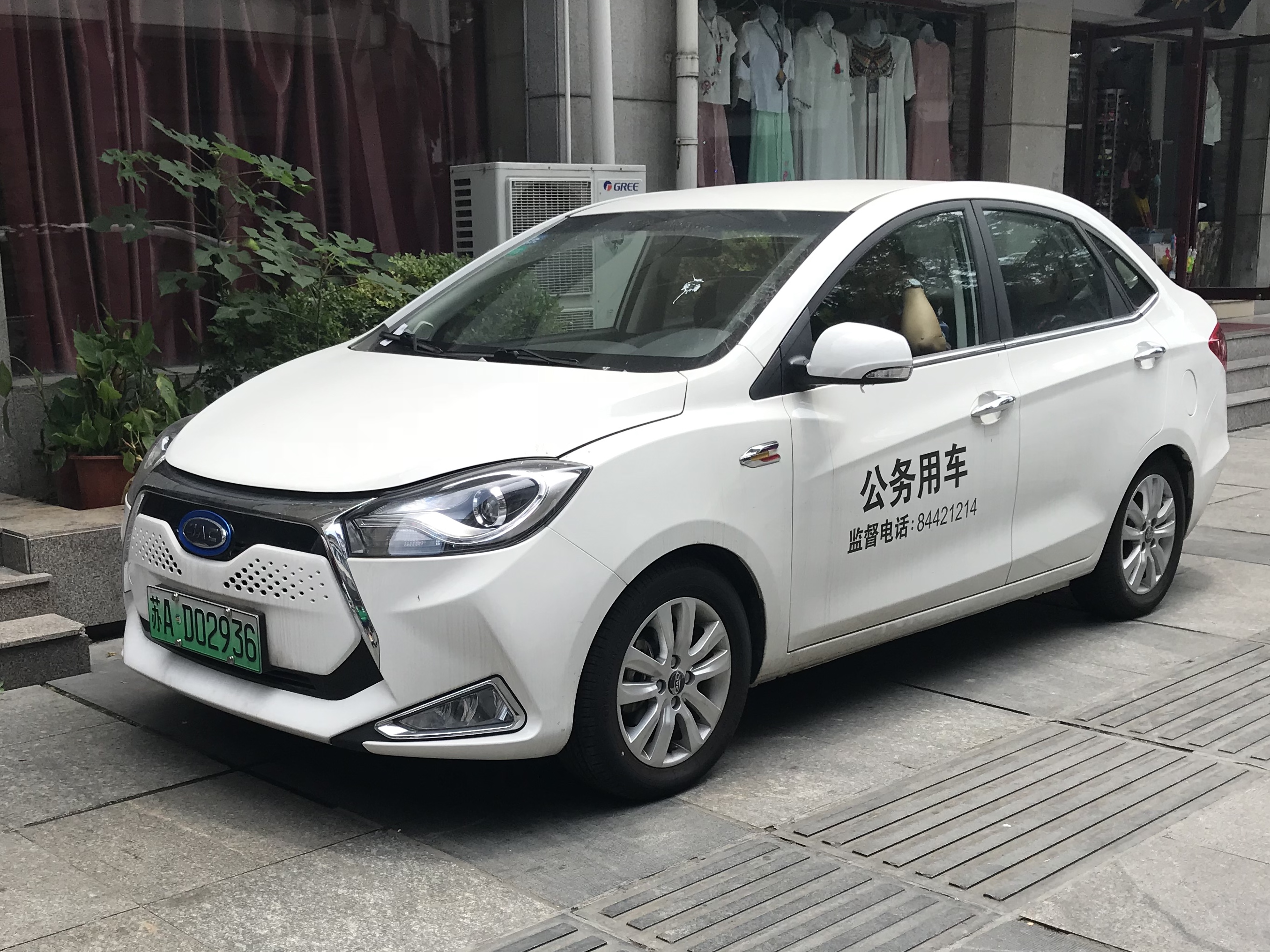
JAC iEV facelift sedan (iEV7)

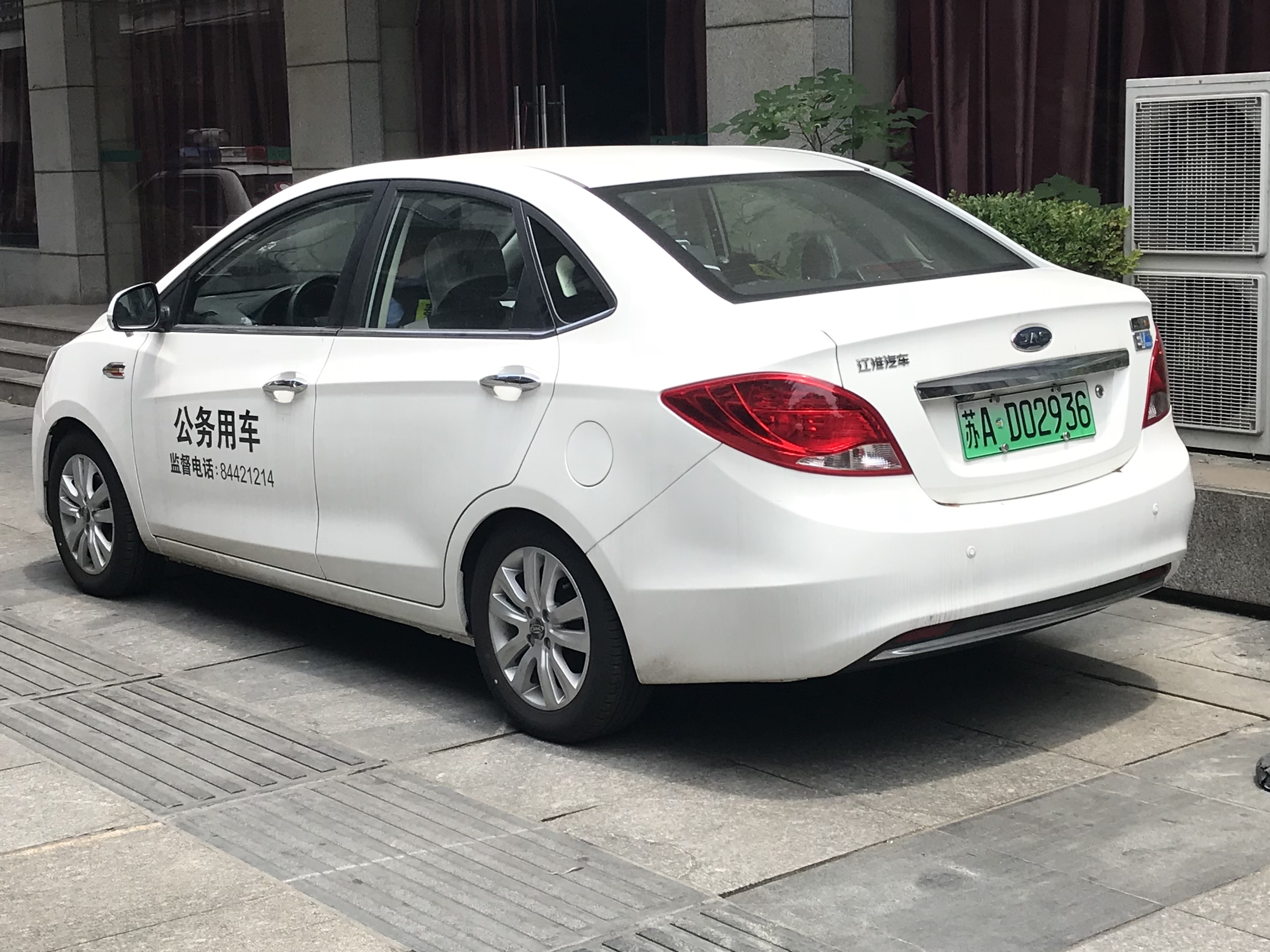
JAC iEV facelift sedan (iEV7)
