= Sehol E20X =

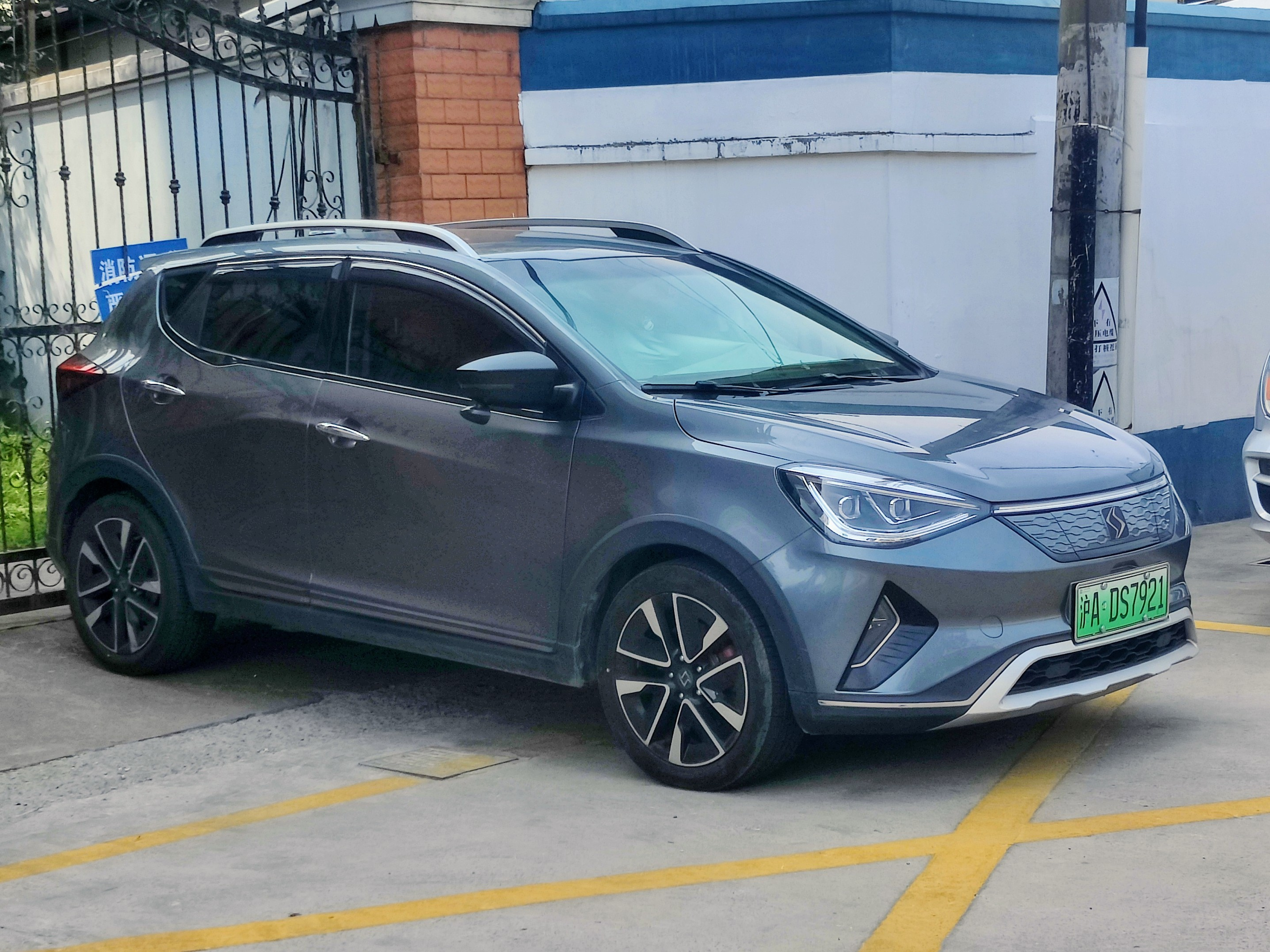

Overview
- Manufacturer: Sehol (JAC Motors)
- Also called: Sol E20X
- Production: 2018–2022
- Model years: 2018–2022
- Assembly: China: Hefei

Body and chassis
- Class: Subcompact crossover SUV (B)
- Body style: 5-door SUV
- Layout: Front-engine, front-wheel-drive
- Related: JAC Refine S2; JAC iEV7S

Powertrain
- Electric motor: Permanent magnet synchronous motor
- Power output: 92 kW (123 hp; 125 PS)
- Transmission: 1-speed direct-drive
- Battery: Li-ion battery: 39 kWh
- Electric range: 402 km (249 mi)

Dimensions
- Wheelbase: 2,490 mm (98.0 in)
- Length: 4,135 mm (162.8 in)
- Width: 1,750 mm (68.9 in)
- Height: 1,565 mm (61.6 in)

The Sehol E20X is an electric subcompact crossover SUV produced under the Sehol brand of JAC Motors.

== Overview ==
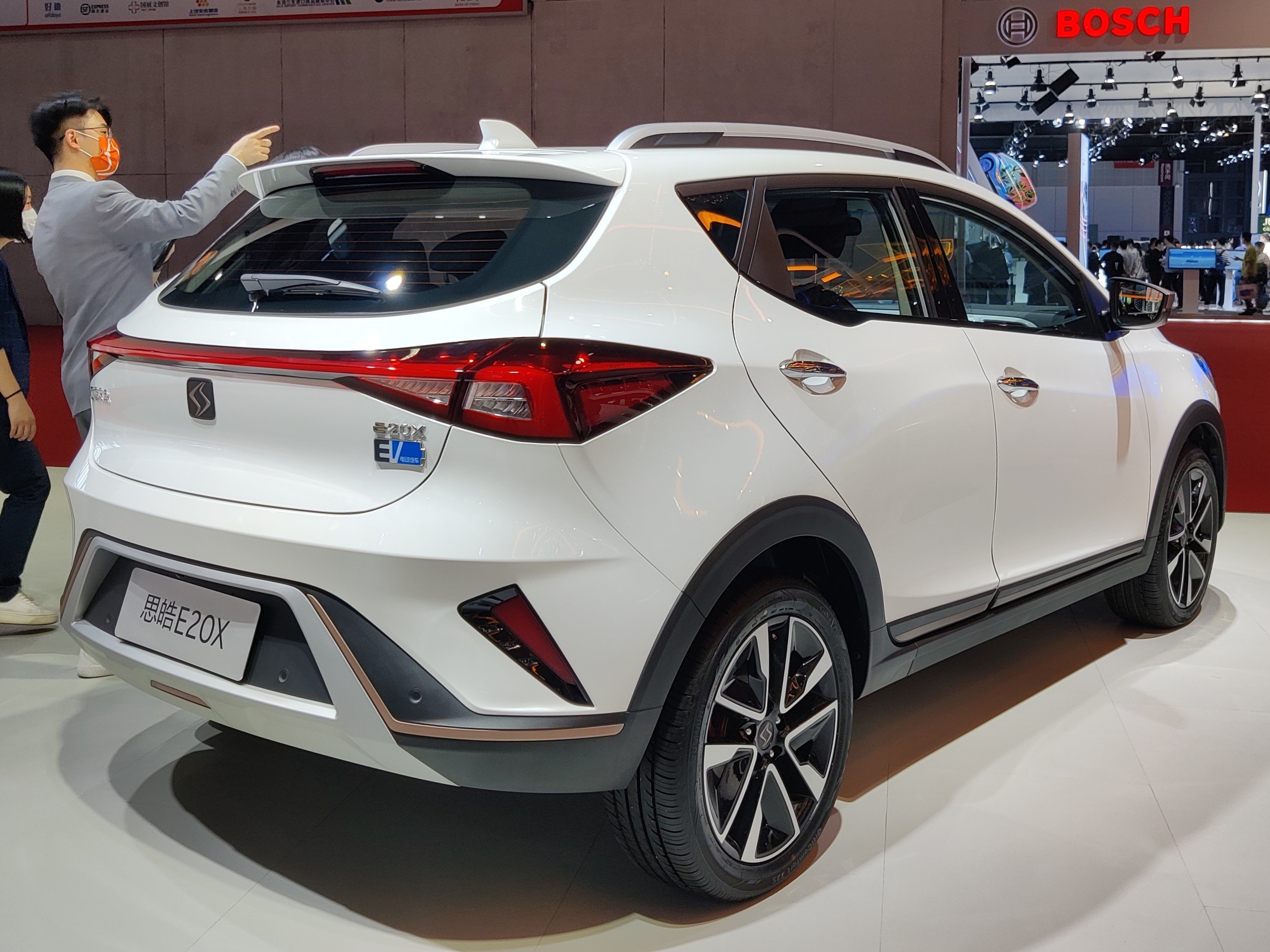
Rear view

The Sehol E20X is the first car produced by Sehol or originally, Sol. The car debuted during the 2018 Beijing Auto Show and is based on the JAC Refine S2 and JAC iEV7S, while featuring a new front that is reminiscent to the front of a SEAT due to the previous plans of bringing electrified SEAT vehicles into China under the Sol brand. The car is only available in China as an electric vehicle.

Sehol or Sol is a car brand launched on April 24, 2018, by SEAT and JAC Volkswagen Automotive Co., Ltd. joint venture, and the Sehol E20X is the first product under the brand.

=== Powertrain ===
The production E20X is powered by a permanent magnet synchronous motor with maximum power of 92 kW (123 hp) and peak torque of 270 Nm. The battery is the 21700 cylindrical battery supplied from Tianjin Lishen with a capacity of 49.5kWh, and the range declared by MIIT is 249miles (402 km), it takes around 50 mins charging from 15% to 80%.

=== Interior ===
The E20X features a high-definition 7-inch LCD instrumental panel and an electronic gear lever featuring stitching leather. The seats are crafted with Alcantara and leather. The higher trim models feature keyless entry, a push button starter, an 8-inch central control touch screen, 360 ° parking assist, blind spot monitoring, 4G wireless network connection, charging port cover one-button open, voice control, remote control and air purification system.
