= JAC Refine S2 =

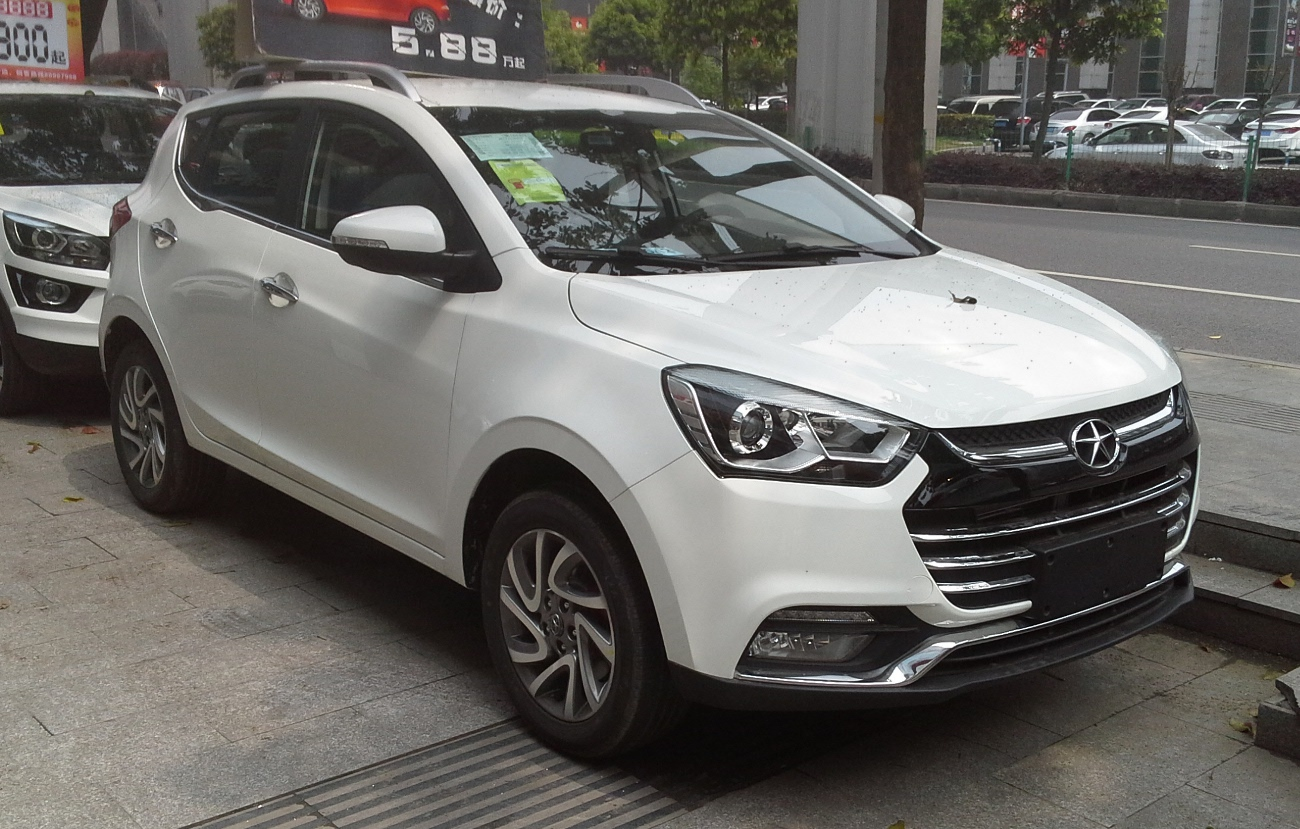

Overview
- Manufacturer: JAC Motors
- Also called: JAC JS2; JAC Sei 2 (Mexico); JAC T40; JAC iEV6S (electric version); JAC iEV7S (electric version); JAC 2 (Mexico, 2025 model); Sehol E20X; JAC iEV40 (electric version in Brazil); EVO3 (Italy); XEV iEV7s (Italy)
- Production: 2015–present
- Model years: 2015–present
- Assembly: Hefei, China; Ciudad Sahagún, Mexico

Body and chassis
- Class: Subcompact crossover SUV (B)
- Body style: 5-door SUV
- Layout: Front-engine, front-wheel-drive
- Platform: Jianghuai A
- Related: JAC Refine S3; Sehol E20X

Powertrain
- Engine: 1.5 L I4 (petrol); 1.6 L I4 (petrol)
- Transmission: 5-speed manual CVT

Dimensions
- Wheelbase: 2,490 mm (98.0 in)
- Length: 4,135 mm (162.8 in)
- Width: 1,750 mm (68.9 in)
- Height: 1,568–1,685 mm (61.7–66.3 in)
- Curb weight: 1,155–1,210 kg (2,546–2,668 lb)

The JAC Refine S2 is a subcompact crossover SUV produced by JAC Motors.

The Refine S2 was also the base vehicle for the Sehol E20X, which is the first car produced by Sehol or originally, Sol.

== Overview ==
The Refine S2 is positioned between the Refine S2 Mini and the Refine S3 compact CUV. The Refine S2 was unveiled at the 2015 Shanghai Auto Show in April 2015, and was later launched in the Chinese market in August 2015. Pricing of the Refine S2 was revealed at the market launch with prices ranging from 58,800 yuan to 75,800 yuan.

=== Powertrain ===
The production Refine S2 is powered by a 1.5 liter four-cylinder petrol engine producing 113 hp and 146 nm. Transmissions available include a six-speed manual transmission or CVT.

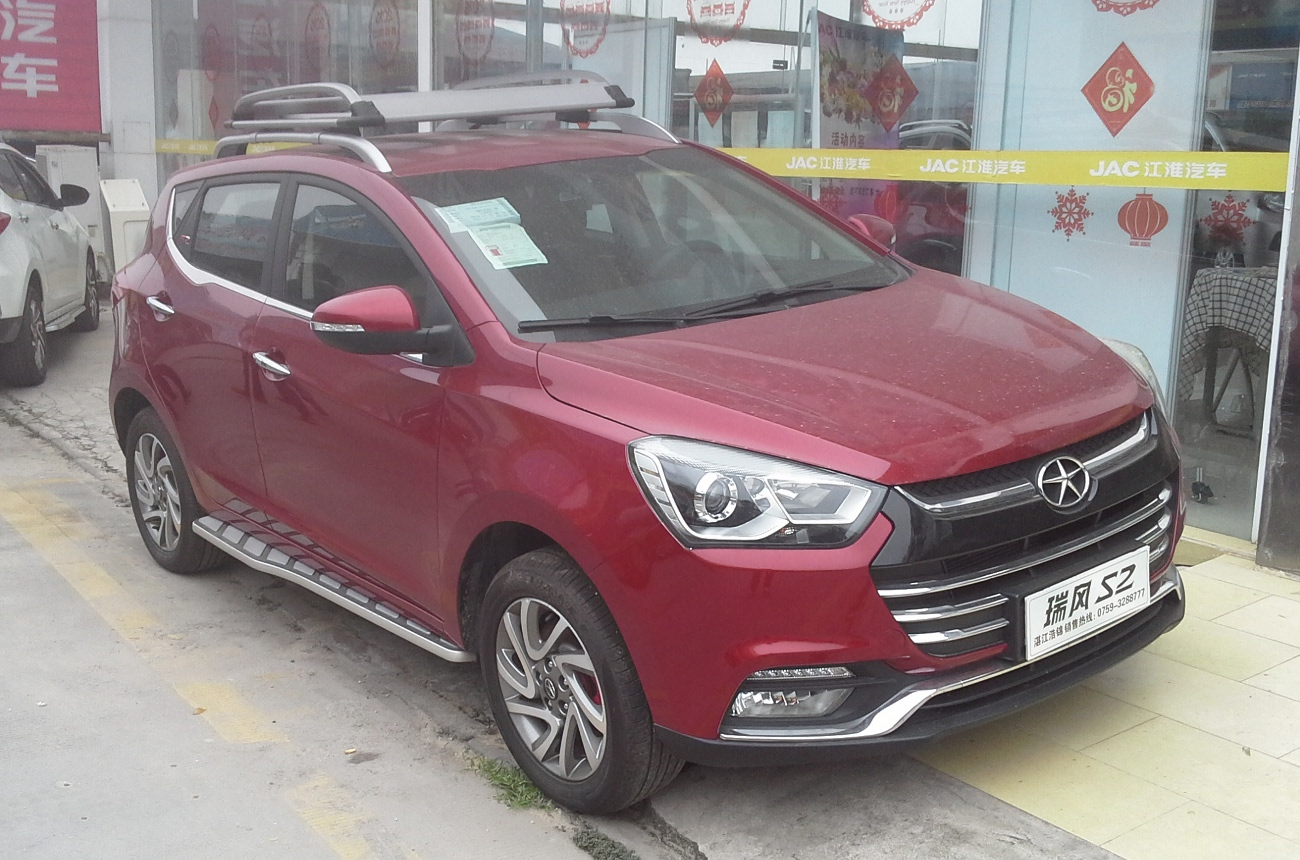
Refine S2 front

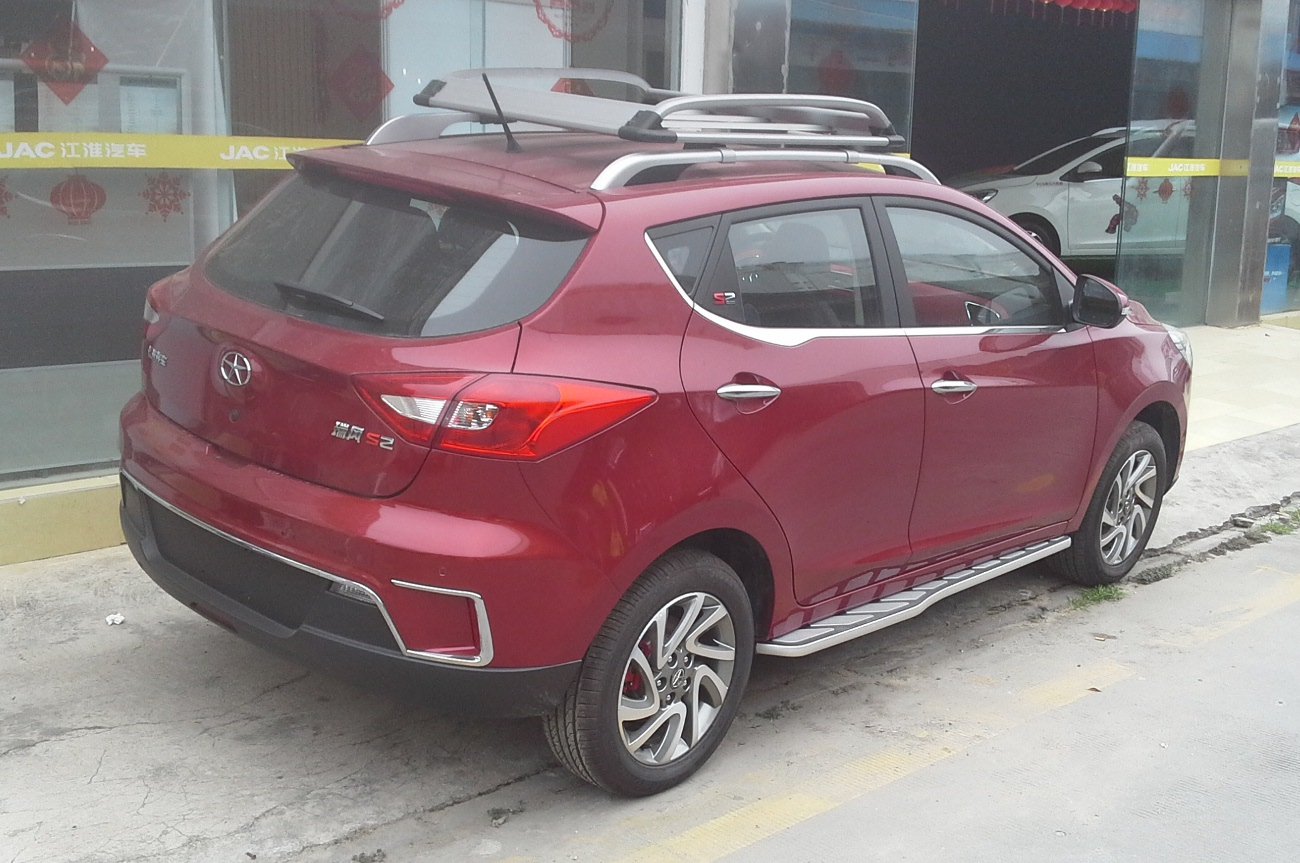
Refine S2 rear

=== JAC iEV7S (2017-2023) ===
The JAC iEV7S is essentially the electric version of the Refine S2. It is powered by an electric motor producing 116 hp and 270 Nm of torque. The iEV7S comes with a 39 kWh battery, and the range of the iEV7S is 280 kilometers. A version with a larger, 49.5-kWh battery is also available. The same platform later spawned the SOL E20X from SOL, the EV joint venture between Volkswagen and JAC, with only a minor restyling for the front and rear DRGs in an attempt to recreate SEAT's styling on the iEV7S.

The price was 119,500 yuan after subsidies; however, it was later lowered, and as of September 2021 the "official guide price" of the base version is 93,500 yuan.

The vehicle is available in at least three European markets: in the Netherlands, in Italy, where it is rebadged as the EVO 3 Electric (stylized as EVO3 Electric); and in Switzerland, where it is available as the JAC e-S2.

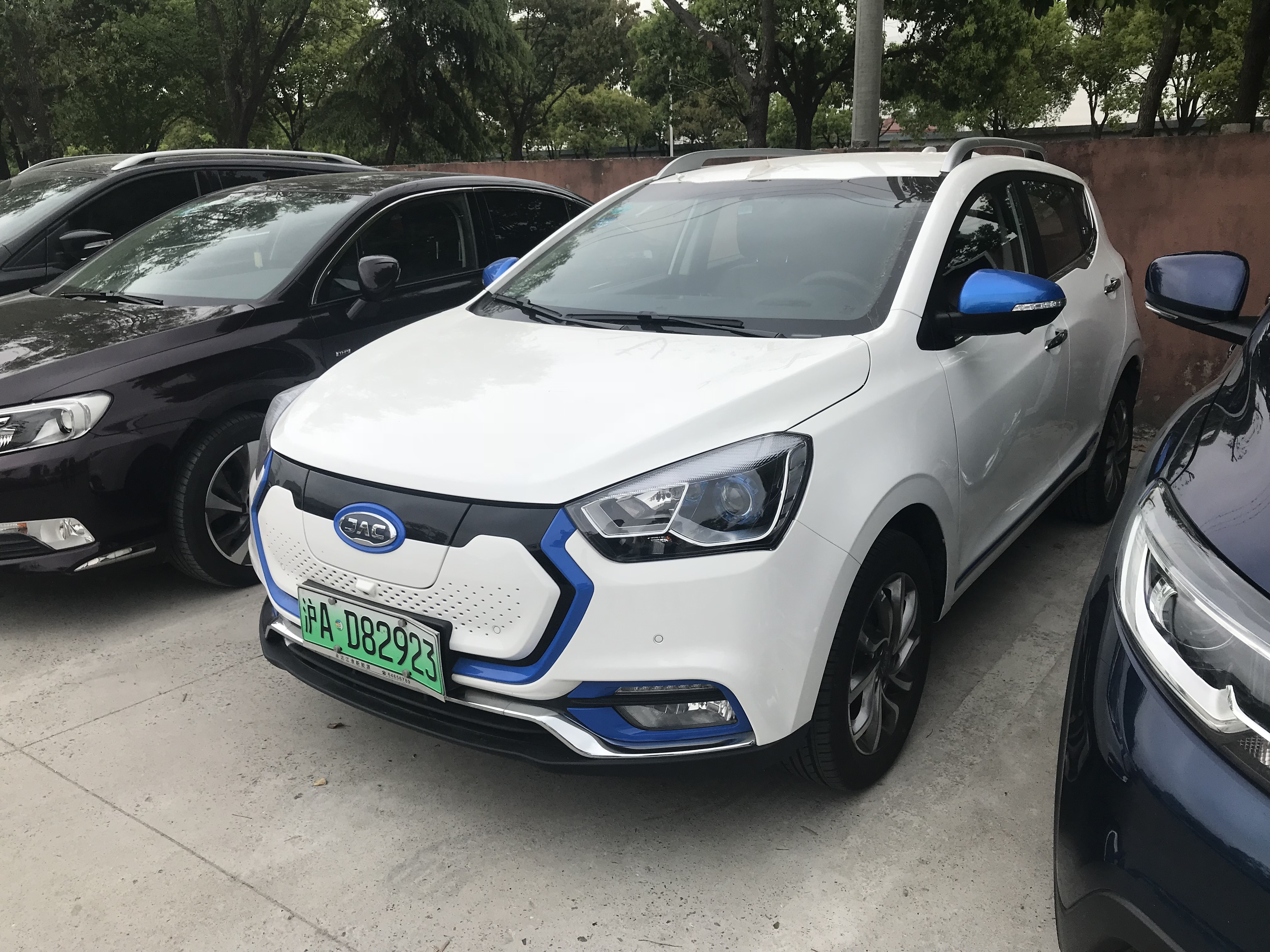
iEV7S front

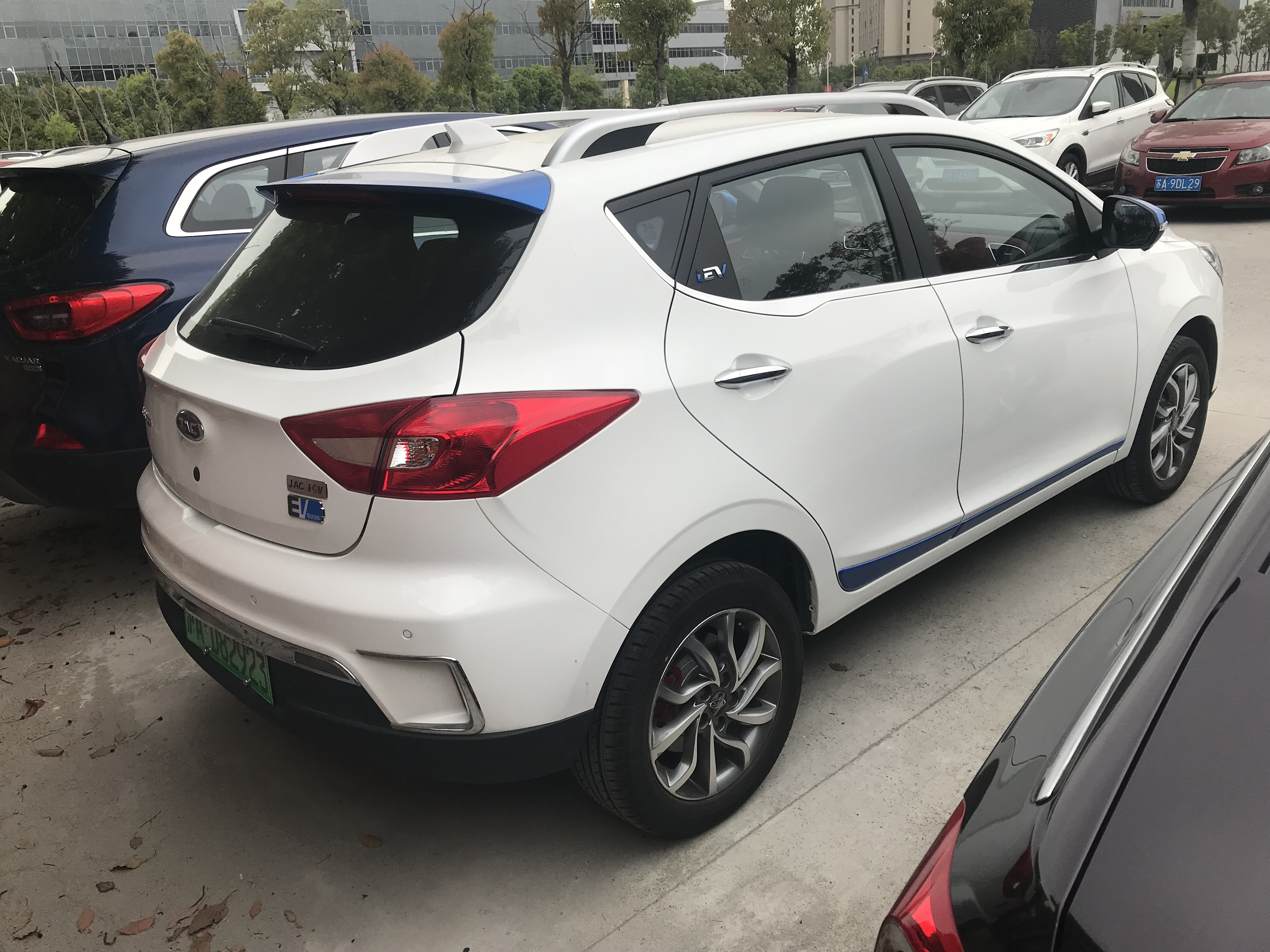
iEV7S rear

=== EVO3 ===
A rebadged version of the Refine S2 manufactured by DR Automobiles is sold in Italy, France, Bulgaria and Spain.

Aesthetically it presents a sportier design and does not equip roof bars.

Also, an LPG version is sold for an additional €1,000.

Likewise, EVO also markets the EVO3 Electric in these countries.

It offers a JAC origin petrol engine of 1.5 cylinder capacity with 113 hp of power is offered, the LPG version subtracts 6 hp from the engine.

The electric version is equipped with a 85 kW permanent magnet synchronous motor.

In 2022, in Spain the price of the EVO3 was €15,900 and the EVO3 Electric version started from €34,160 without state aid. A year later, the electric one was discontinued and the ICE versions are sold in €17,900.

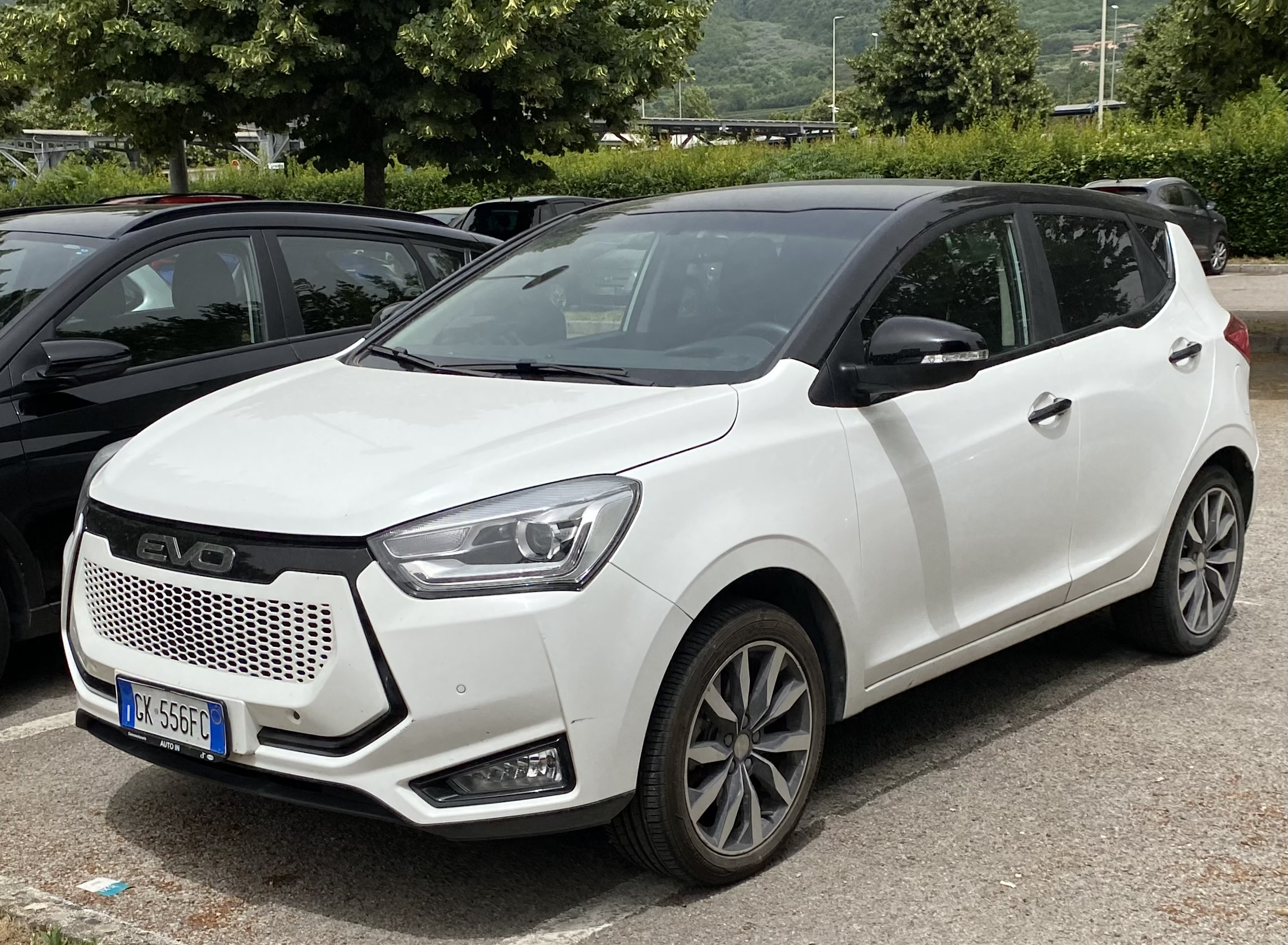
EVO 3 front

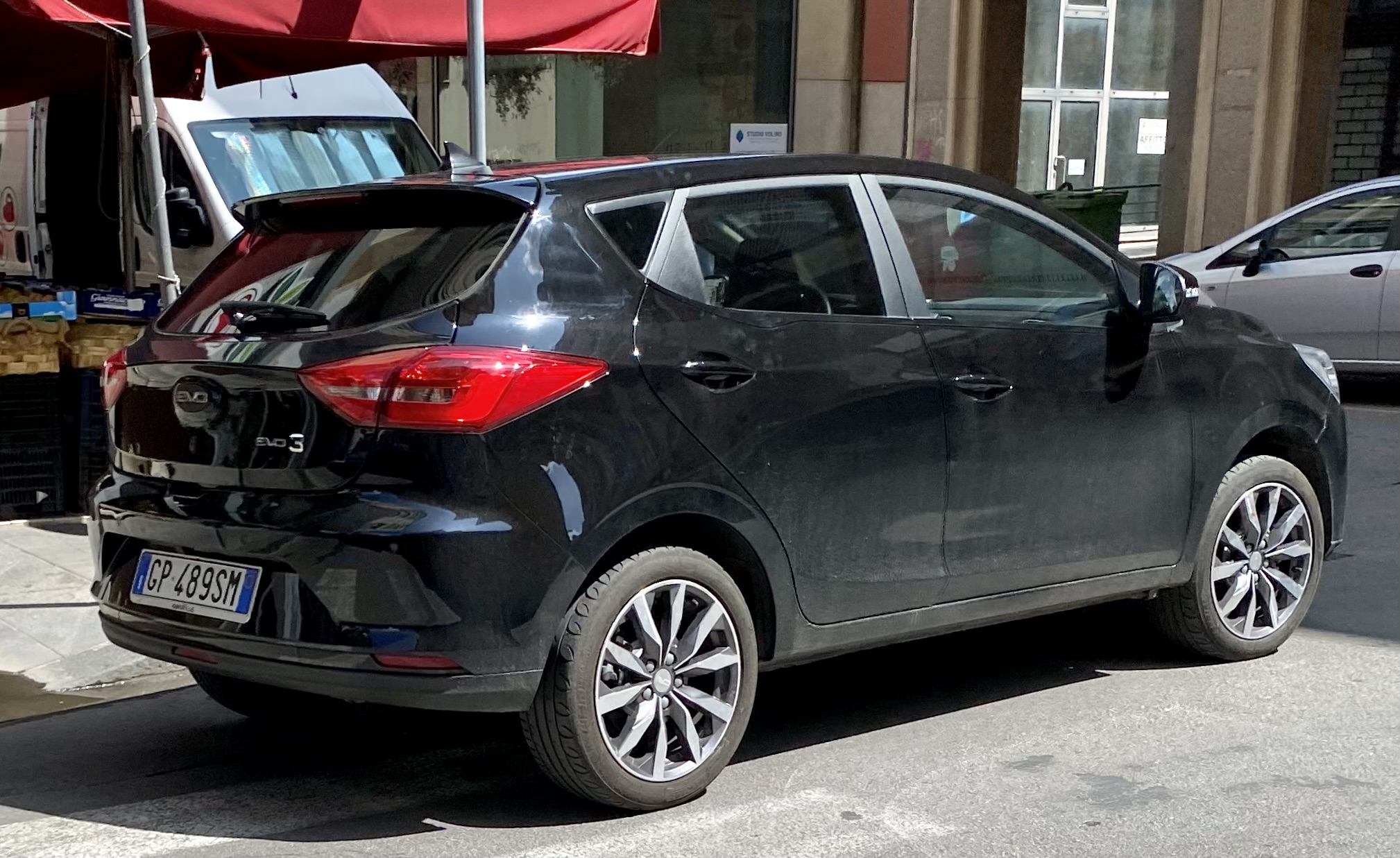
EVO3 rear
