= Brabus E V12 =

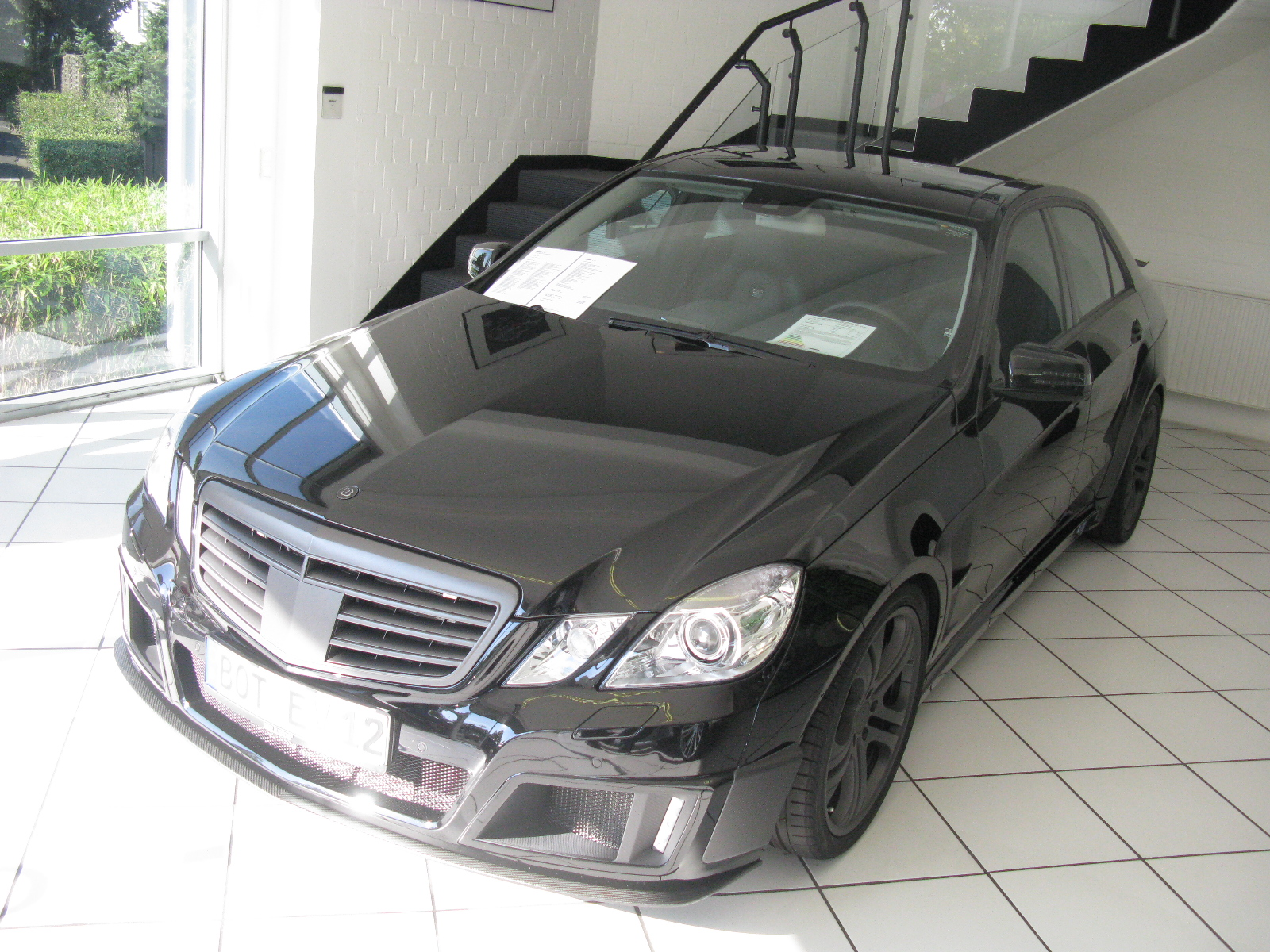
- Mercedes-benz EV12 Brabus W212

Overview
- Manufacturer: Brabus

Body and chassis
- Body style: 4-door saloon
- Layout: FR layout
- Related: Mercedes-Benz E-Class

Chronology
- Successor: Brabus Rocket

The Brabus E V12 is a tuned Mercedes-Benz E-Class made by Mercedes-Benz tuning company Brabus. It was succeeded by the Brabus Rocket which is based on the Mercedes-Benz CLS-Class (W219).

== History ==
The history of Brabus fitting a V12 in an E-class Mercedes-Benz begins with the W124 with the V12 from the W140 S600 being shoehorned into the smaller car and Brabus increasing displacement to 7.3. The W210 model was the successor to the W124, At the time Guinness Book of Records confirmed it was the fastest four-door sedan. The W210 also took the self-acclaimed title of most powerful street-legal Mercedes engine. Under the hood featured a 7.3-liter version of Mercedes V12. Brabus claimed the engine produced 582 horsepower and 780 nm of torque (575.3 lb/ft), all while propelling the car to an electronically limited 330 km/h (205 mph).

Proceeding the W210, the new W211 followed, bringing with twin-turbochargers. The new engine produced 640 horsepower, 1026 Nm (757 lb/ft)and the car could reach 350.2 km/h (217.6 mph). The work that Brabus did to the 6.3-liter twin-turbocharged V12 was enough to help them reclaim the Guinness World Record for fastest four-door sedan.

Continuing on with the W211 chassis, Brabus was able to rub even more power out of the 6.3-liter mill. Now power was produced in the range of 730 horsepower and torque climbed to 1320 Nm (973.6 lb/ft). Torque was then electronically limited to 1100 Nm (811 lb/ft) because of extensive strain put on the transmission. Proving yet again Brabus could produce world contenders, it set a record of 365.7 km/h (227.2 mph) on the Nardo circuit. In most recent projects for the E-class, Brabus set out to produce 1000 lb/ft from Mercedes twin-turbo V12.

The final product codenamed W212 featured the most power to-date from the German tuner. Brabus managed to unleash 800 horsepower and 1420 Nm (1047 lb/ft) from the V12. Despite having the torque electronically limited to 1100 Nm (811 lb/ft) yet again, Brabus claims the sedan can hit a top speed of 370 km/h (230 mph).

== W212 ==
At the Frankfurt Motor show in 2009, Brabus debuted its Brabus E V12 “one of ten”. The E V12 features Mercedes' latest twin-turbo V12 producing over 780 horsepower and 1100 lb/ft of torque. This helped propel the car to a 0–60 mph in 3.7 seconds, all the way to a top speed of 370 km/h (230 mph).

== Performance (W212) ==
- Curb weight: 1980 kg/ 4365 lbs.
- Engine: V12- 3 valves/cylinder Light Alloy Block with Twin-Turbochagers
- Displacement: 6,233cc (6.2L)
- Max power: 800 hp (788 bhp / 588 kW) at 5,500 rpm
- Max torque: 1,420 Nm (1,047 lb/ft) from 2,100 rpm (electrically limited to 1,100 Nm/ 811 lb/ft)
- Acceleration:
  - 0 – 100 km/h (62 mph): 3.7 sec.
  - 0 – 200 km/h (124 mph): 9.9 sec.
  - 0 – 300 km/h (186 mph): 23.9 sec.
- Top speed : 370 km/h/230 mph (electronically limited to 350 km/h/217 mph).

== Specifications ==
Brabus begins with the E-class 5.5-liter V8 and replaces it with a 6.3-liter twin-turbo V12. All the extra displacement is courtesy of a longer stroking crankshaft, larger cylinder bore, larger pistons and new piston rods. The air intake and twin turbo system were developed and tuned in house by Brabus. The setup includes custom headers as well as four water-to-air intercoolers. Brabus completes the package with a free-flowing high-performance stainless steel exhaust.

Brabus also tuned the electronic components of the car. Reprogramming the mapping for ignition and injection ensuring performance and emission standards are met. All the power produced by the engine is transferred to the rear wheels via a five-speed automatic transmission. To keep the car safe to drive, Brabus equipped a limited-slip differential and a stability control program.

Brabus also includes many aesthetic changes to the standard E-Class. Developed in a wind tunnel, the E V12 features an aerodynamic kit made from lightweight, high strength carbon-fiber increasing the width of the car by 36 millimeters (1.4 inches). This wider stance proves to be useful for stability at higher speeds. The cars sits on Monoblock Q wheels size 9.5Jx19 wrapped around Yokohama tyres. The front axle features 265/35 ZR 19 tyres while the rear sport 285/30 ZR 19 tyres. Stopping comes courtesy of 12-piston aluminum fixed calipers and steel discs, measuring 380 x 37 millimeters (15.0 x 1.5 inches). At the rear six-piston aluminum fixed calipers measuring 360 x 28 millimeters (14.2 x1.1 inches).

== Performance ==
Brabus has made it their trademark to make powerful models outside Mercedes-Benz product range. They have implanted the V12 engine from S-class into three models - E V12, G V12 and ML V12. As is customary for the company, the engine was heavily tuned and was much more powerful than the original.

== See also ==
- Mercedes-Benz E-Class
- Brabus Rocket
- Brabus Bullit
