= PML Flightlink =

PML Flightlink (previously Primted Motors Ltd) was a Hampshire based firm specialising in the design and manufacture of "pancake" (flat) electric motors. The company operated for over 30 years in a number of markets including defense, aerospace, mobility, motion control, processing and printing. In 2006, they demonstrated an in-wheel electric motor for cars called the Hi-Pa Drive at the British Motor Show in London, using a Mini dubbed the "Mini QED." Two other car manufacturers have also presented concept cars using this technology: Volvo in its Volvo ReCharge, and Ford with a Ford F150 pick-up prototype presented at the 2008 SEMA Show in Las Vegas.

== Administration and split ==
On 28 November 2008 by UK court order PML was put into administration (insolvency handling in the UK similar to Chapter 11 in the United States). After the court case, PML was split in two in 2009: Protean Electric continue to develop automotive in-wheel motor applications of the Hi-Pa Drive; and Printed Motor Works design and manufacture printed armature/pancake electric motors, joysticks and drive systems.
