= Hi-Pa Drive =

The Hi-Pa Drive (pronounced hyper) system is an electric in-wheel motor power delivery system.

== Demonstration vehicles ==
In 2006, PML Flightlink demonstrated the Hi-Pa Drive in a series-hybrid car at the British Motor Show in London, using a Mini dubbed the "Mini QED" with its in-wheel motor at all four wheels. Two other car manufacturers have also presented concept cars using this technology: Ford with a Ford F150 pick-up prototype presented at the 2008 SEMA Show in Las Vegas and Volvo in its Volvo ReCharge. However, Volvo has stated that it will not be using the Hi-Pa Drive in the production of all-electric version of the C30 ReCharge nor in its new diesel-electric plug-in hybrids due in 2012.

== Technology and claimed benefits ==
- In-wheel motor: The propulsion system and development platform acts as an electric motor, generator or brake and is several times lighter, smaller and powerful than the conventional electronic propulsion systems and generators it replaces.
- Power electronics: The embedded (in the motor) control electronics reliably, efficiently and precisely manages the control of the motors to provide smooth operation when driving at any speed.
- Energy management: The integrated power management system distributes drive power to the motor and then recaptures and feeds most of that energy back into the battery using a regenerative system.
- Drive software: The control software helps engineers optimize energy efficiency and vehicle performance while giving drivers more control over the driving experience.

== See also ==
- Wheel hub motor
