= Protean Electric =

- Type: Private
- Industry: Automotive technology
- Founded: 2009
- Headquarters: Farnham, United Kingdom
- Key people: Andrew Whitehead (CEO)
- Products: Electric in-wheel motors
- Number of employees: 114 (January 2018)
- Website: proteanelectric.com

Protean Electric is an automotive technology company specializing in in-wheel motor technology. It has developed an in-wheel, electric-drive system for hybrid, plug-in hybrid, and battery electric vehicles.

Their technology creates a permanent magnet e-machine with relatively high torque and power density with the power electronics and controls packaged within the motor itself. Their in-wheel motor product is intended to be produced in low volume by Protean and licensed in high volume to global automotive and Tier 1 automotive supply companies.

With approximately 110 employees, Protean is a privately held firm with operations in the United States, the United Kingdom, and China. Five years after being sold by NEVS to BEDEO, it was acquired by EXEDY Corporation.

== Technology ==
Protean Electric's in-wheel motor is intended to save space on board the vehicle by allowing the drive system to be mounted behind a conventional road wheel and apply torque directly to the wheel and tire.

Each of Protean's in-wheel motors can deliver 80 kW (100 hp) and 1250 Nm (935 lb-ft) and weigh 36 kg (75 lbs.). They are sized to fit within the space of a conventional 16- or 18-inch road wheel. The electric motors are designed for use in front-, rear- and all-wheel drive vehicle applications and can be adapted to existing internal combustion engine powered cars and trucks to turn them into hybrids.

Since Protean Electric's motors fit behind the wheels of a vehicle, they can be used as part of a drive system that does not require a gearbox, differential, or drive shafts. This creates an energy-efficient drivetrain that potentially saves cost, reduces weight and frees up space on board the vehicle that was previously dedicated to drivetrain components. According to Protean Electric, its in-wheel motors can increase fuel economy by over 30 percent depending on the battery size and driving cycle in a hybrid or plug-in hybrid vehicle. It is also capable of enabling torque vectoring by applying individual torque at optimal levels to each wheel to improve vehicle safety and handling.

Protean has been awarded over 120 patents for its technology and design, and more than 100 additional patent applications have been filed and are pending internationally and with specific countries in North America, Europe and Asia.

In-wheel motors offer the benefits of drastically improved vehicle packaging, simplified two-wheel or all-wheel-drive layouts, the option of through-the-road hybridization, more efficient regenerative braking, and the most direct wheel control possible. The downside is added unsprung weight which can impact handling performance. During their research efforts, Protean Electric and Lotus found that most negative effects of added unsprung mass could be eliminated by adding suspension damping, and that the ability to utilize accurate torque vectoring actually improved car's handling so much that the net effect of the whole arrangement was positive.

Another drawback of in-wheel motors is the fundamental physical reality that their location inside the wheel places them in much closer proximity to road impacts. In other words, an in-wheel motor must directly cope with these forces exerted on the wheel, without the cushioning effect of a suspension. This type of layout stands in contrast to the traditional mounting location of the motor in the vehicle body, an arrangement that ensures that a sudden road impact to the wheel is directly and immediately dealt with by the suspension, thereby ensuring that the vehicle body (containing the motor and all other components) is exposed to very little of the road shock.

Furthermore, an in-wheel motor must also operate in much closer proximity to physical insults from the road, including road grit, water, and saltwater (from road-deicing salts in cold climate). These concerns must be addressed in the design and engineering of such motors.

Additionally, the location of in-wheel motors, combined with the fact that four of them are needed (for a four-wheel-drive vehicle), may result in more complicated maintenance. However, on the other hand, with in-wheel motors, no differentials are required, so this aspect serves to simplify the maintenance aspect.

== Company background ==
Protean has been developing in-wheel electric motors for several years. Protean Electric was founded in 2009 after PML Flightlink was put into administration in 2008. Protean Electric began to focus entirely on the in-wheel technology for automotive applications. Protean has been owned by BEDEO since October 2021, after buying the company from NEVS.

The suppliers and partners are: SKF, FEV, AB Mikroelektronik GmbH, Alcon, ATS Automation Tooling Systems, and Trelleborg Sealing Solutions.

Protean Electric's in-wheel motor technology was recognized by the World Economic Forum, which named Protean a 2012 Technology Pioneer and received recognition from Car and Driver magazine as one of the ten most promising technologies for 2013.

== See also ==
- BEDEO
- Brabus
