= Brabus Rocket =

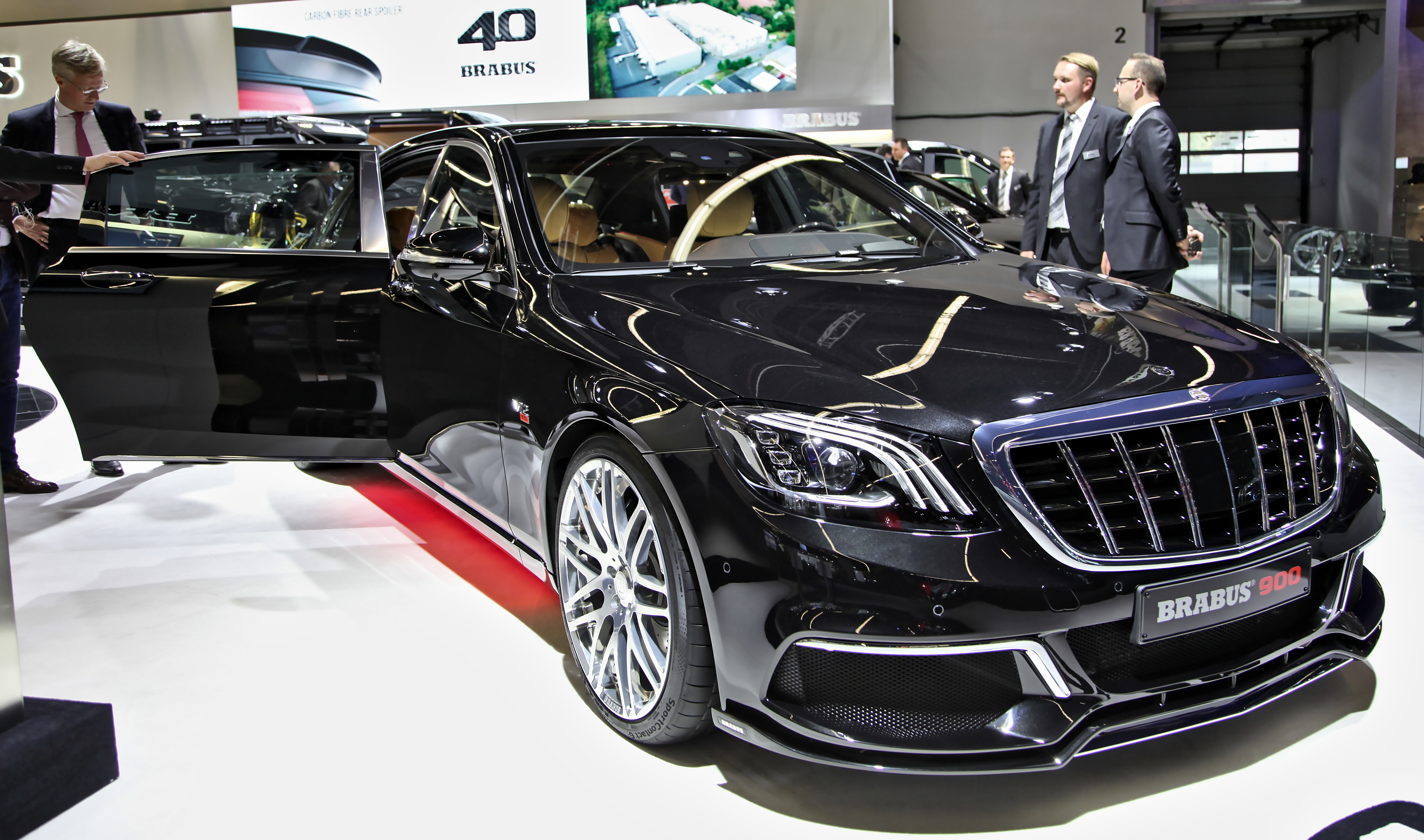

Overview
- Manufacturer: Brabus

Body and chassis
- Body style: 4-door saloon
- Layout: FR layout; Front-engine, all-wheel drive (4MATIC)
- Related: Mercedes-Benz CLS (Rocket/Rocket 700/Rocket 730); Mercedes-AMG GT 4-Door Coupé (Rocket 900)

Powertrain
- Engine: 6.3 litre M275 Brabus SV12 S Biturbo V12; 4.4 L M177 Biturbo V8
- Transmission: 5-speed automatic 9-speed Mercedes-AMG Speedshift MCT 9G automatic

Chronology
- Predecessor: Brabus E V12

The Brabus Rocket produced since 2006, is a series of modified vehicles produced by Brabus, a German high-performance vehicle company.

== Brabus Rocket (2006 – ) ==
The Brabus Rocket (2006 – ) is a modified version of the Mercedes-Benz CLS-Class (W219), which has been produced by Brabus since 2006. It is fitted with a 6.2 litre twin-turbocharged version of the Mercedes-Benz M275 V12 engine and produces 730 PS (540 kW; 720 hp).

=== Police car (2006 – ) ===
In 2006, the German Federal Traffic Ministry and the Association of German Automobile Tuners (Brabus), created a Tune It Safe! program. From this program, Brabus unveiled a police car version of the Mercedes CLS V12 S Rocket. It quickly became the most publicized of any of Brabus' designs.

=== Engine ===
Type	Power, torque@rpm
6,233 cc (6.233 L; 380.4 cu in) V12 twin turbo (Brabus SV12 S)	730 PS (540 kW; 720 hp)@5100, 1,320 N⋅m (970 lb⋅ft)@2100, electronically limited to 1,100 N⋅m (810 lb⋅ft)@2100

The engine was modified from a 5.5L V12 engine block (Mercedes-Benz M275).

=== Performance ===
Accelerations (km/h)			Top speed
0-100	0-200	0-300	Top speed
3.2	10.0	29.5	365.7 km/h (227.2 mph), electronically limited to 350 km/h (220 mph)

=== Land Speed Record ===
In 2006, the Brabus Rocket set the world land speed record for a street-legal saloon (including any police car). The Rocket recorded 365.7 km/h (227.2 mph) on the Nardò Ring in Italy.

== Brabus Rocket 800 (2011 – ) ==
The Brabus Rocket 800 is based on the Mercedes C218 sedan. It was unveiled in 2011 at the Frankfurt Motor Show. The engine was heavily modified, with a carbon-fiber ram-air intake system, twin turbochargers, four intercoolers, and a stainless steel exhaust system. Power was delivered via a seven-speed quick-shift gearbox with a limited-slip differential. The car featured a reprogrammed engine management system, traction control, ESP, ABS and brake assist.

The form factor was also reworked, with the car over 40mm wider than the stock CLS sedan. It featured air inlets above the radiator cutout, side skirts with integrated LED entrance lights, a rear wing and a rear diffuser. The suspension was Bilstein height-adjustable coilover units, with settings for bound and rebound which can be selected by the driver.

The braking system was composed of vented and grooved steel front and rear brake discs, with 12-piston aluminum fixed calipers for the front brakes and six-piston calipers for the rear. The wheels were nineteen inch one-piece Brabus Monoblock F wheels with Yokohama Advan Sport tires (255/35 ZR 19 front, 285/30 ZR 19 rear).

=== Engine ===
Type	Power, torque@rpm
6,233 cc (6.233 L; 380.4 cu in) V12 twin turbo (Brabus SV12 S?)	800 PS (588 kW; 789 hp)@5500, 1,420 N⋅m (1,047 lb⋅ft)@2100, electronically limited to 1,100 N⋅m (811 lb⋅ft)@2100

The engine was modified from a 5.5L V12 engine block (Mercedes-Benz M275?).

=== Performance ===
Accelerations (km/h)			Top speed
0-100	0-200	200-300	Top speed
3.7	9.8	13.8	370 km/h (230 mph)?, electronically limited to 350 km/h (217 mph)

== Brabus Rocket 730 (2014 – ) ==
The 2014 design was based on the Mercedes-Benz CLS 63 AMG, with a body kit (new bumpers, air intakes), twin ten-spoke alloy wheels, spoilers, quad exhaust tips, foot pedals, diffusers, and the Brabus logos. The Rocket 730 used the same V12 twin turbo engine as the original Brabus Rocket.

=== Engine ===
Type	Power, torque@rpm
6,233 cc (6.233 L; 380.4 cu in) V12 twin turbo (Brabus SV12 S)	730 PS (537 kW; 720 hp)@5100?, 1,320 N⋅m (974 lb⋅ft)?@1750-5000, electronically limited to 1,065 N⋅m (786 lb⋅ft)@?

The engine was modified from a 5.5L V12 engine block (Mercedes-Benz M275).

=== Transmission ===
All models include a 7–speed AMG Speedshift MCT transmission.

=== Performance ===
Accelerations (km/h)			Top speed
0-100	0-200	0-300	Top speed
3.8	?	?	350 km/h (217 mph), electronically limited to 310 km/h (193 mph)

== Brabus Rocket 900 (2015 – ) ==
The 2015 model was based on the Mercedes-Benz S65 AMG. It included "a carbon-fiber aerodynamic-enhancement kit (Brabus front spoiler lip, front bumper attachments with clear-coated carbon-fiber finish, carbon-fiber Brabus front fenders, integrated Brabus logo at front fender with optional lighting, Brabus clear-coated carbon-fiber mirror, Brabus rear spoiler lip and the rear bumper with integrated clear-coated carbon-fiber diffusor, tailor-made cutouts for the Brabus sports exhausts system with two dual designer tailpipes), 21/22-inch Brabus Monoblock alloy wheels (optional Brabus "Platinum Edition" 21-inch wheels), Continental/Pirelli/Yokohama 255/35 ZR 21 front and 295/30 ZR 21 rear tires (255/30 ZR 22 front and 295/25 ZR 22 rear tires for 22-inch wheels), two-tone Brabus leather interior upholstery in light-colored vellum and black, Brabus "iBusiness" infotainment system (iPad mini tablet, power-retractable 15.6-inch TFT display with an aspect ratio of 16:9, screens at back of the front head restraints, Apple iPod touch with 64GB memory), turbochargers with larger compressor unit, modified exhaust manifolds, 80 mm (3.1 in) diameter down pipes, a stainless-steel Brabus sports exhaust system with free-flow metal catalysts and actively controlled butterfly valve, Brabus 900 intake module (a special air filter housing with larger cross-section and special filters, "Gold Heat Reflection" sheathing), Motul powertrain lubricants, Brabus high-performance limited-slip differential with a locking rate of 40 percent, Brabus RACE aluminum paddle shifters on the steering wheel, Brabus Airmatic Sport adjustable air suspension unit with 15 mm (0.6 in) lower ride height, Mac mini in the trunk with power-retractable drawer, stainless-steel scuff plates with backlit Brabus logo alternating between red and white, and a Brabus instrument cluster with a 400-km/h (250-mph) scale".

The vehicle was unveiled at the 2015 Geneva Motor Show.

The vehicle went on sale for 347,719 euro.

=== Brabus Rocket 900 "Desert Gold" Edition (2015 – ) ===
The 2015 Desert Gold edition was based on the Brabus Rocket 900. It included "Desert Gold body colour, chrome parts in black, naked carbon components in high-gloss coating, Brabus sports exhaust tips in glossy black, 21-inch Brabus Monoblock F "Platinum Edition" cross-spoke forged wheels, Continental/Pirelli/Yokohama 255/35 ZR 21 front and 295/30 ZR 21 rear tires, black and gold Mastik leather upholstery with gold-colored seams and piping, embroidered "900" logo on the head restraints, switches and bezels in gold-colored coating, headliner of the sedan in deep black Alcantara, and an optional multimedia system".

The vehicle was unveiled at the 2015 Dubai International Motor Show.

=== Engine ===
Type	Power, torque@rpm
6,233 cc (6.2 L; 380.4 cu in) (6,300 cc (6.3 L; 384.4 cu in)?) V12 twin turbo (Brabus SV12 S?)	900 PS (662 kW; 888 hp)@5500, 1,500 N⋅m (1,106 lb⋅ft)@4200, electronically limited to 1,200 N⋅m (885 lb⋅ft)@?

The engine was modified from the M279 6.0L V12 engine block.

=== Performance ===
Accelerations (km/h)			Top speed
0-100	0-200	200-300	Top speed
3.7	9.1	13.2	over 350 km/h (217 mph)

== Brabus Rocket 900 "ONE OF TEN" (2020 – ) ==
The BRABUS ROCKET 900 "ONE OF TEN" is a limited edition of ten vehicles being produced based on the Mercedes-AMG GT 63 S 4MATIC+ (4-Door Coupé).

The heart of this BRABUS automobile is the new BRABUS ROCKET 900 V8 biturbo displacement engine, which, thanks to the expansion to 4.4 liters and a newly developed high-performance charging system, achieves a peak output of 662 kW / 900 PS. The maximum torque is 1,250 Nm, but is limited to 1,050 Nm in the vehicle.

In combination with the Speedshift MCT 9-speed sports transmission and all-wheel drive, the four-seater coupé goes from zero to 100 km/h in 2.8 seconds. 300 km/h is reached in 23.9 seconds. The top speed is electronically limited to 330 km/h (205 mph) due to the tires. It has 21-inch wheels up front, 22-inch wheels at the rear; to accommodate these, the Rocket is also fitted with wide bodied fenders in carbon fibre.

=== Engine ===
Type	Power, torque@rpm
4,407 cc (4.4 L; 269 cu in) V8 bi turbo	900 PS (662 kW; 888 hp) at 6200 rpm, 1,250 N⋅m (922 lb⋅ft) at 2900 rpm – electronically limited to 1,050 N⋅m (774 lb⋅ft)

The engine was modified and extended to 4.4 litres from the original M177 4.0-litre Biturbo V8 engine block.

=== Performance ===
Accelerations (km/h)			Top speed
0-100	0-200	0-300	Top speed
2.8	9.7	23.9	330 km/h (205 mph)

== See also ==
- Brabus Bullit
