= Brabus =

German high-performance automotive aftermarket tuning company

Brabus GmbH
- Type: Private
- Industry: Automotive
- Founded: 1977; 49 years ago
- Founders: Bodo Buschmann; Klaus Brackmann
- Headquarters: Bottrop, Germany
- Area served: Worldwide
- Key people: Constantin Buschmann (CEO)
- Products: Automobiles
- Subsidiaries: Startech (CRD)
- Website: www.brabus.com

Brabus GmbH (stylized in uppercase) is a German automotive aftermarket high-performance tuning company founded in 1977 in Bottrop (Ruhr area). Brabus specialises mainly in Mercedes-Benz, Maybach and Smart vehicles. They have also modified other vehicles, including Porsche, and, as of December 2025, Bentley.

== History ==
The company began with Bodo Buschmann wanting to customise his cars. Discovering most existing customisers could not grasp his vision or meet his requirements, he started his own brand. Brabus GmbH was registered in 1977 in West Germany with Buschmann's friend Klaus Brackmann to satisfy German law requiring a company to be established with at least two people. The company name was derived from the first three characters of the founders' surnames (Brackmann, Buschmann). Following the company's foundation, Brackmann sold his company shares to Buschmann for 100 Deutsche Marks.

In 2012, Brabus had started building its third factory in Bottrop.

== Operations ==
Brabus's primary focus is to achieve maximum car performance through the increase of horsepower and speed. Customers can either buy cars from Brabus, or send in their cars to be customized and/or overhauled. Customers ordering a car directly involves Brabus purchasing a particular model from Mercedes and then modifying it according to the customer's requests. Brabus is known for providing expensive tuning.

Brabus also offers cosmetic modifications including low-profile spoilers, body kits, carbon fiber splitters, and multi-piece alloy wheels. Other upgrades include racing limited-slip differentials, open racing exhaust systems, twelve-piston disc brakes, and engine remapping. Customers can also have complete engine overhauls, or have new crate engines from AMG modified for them.

Brabus engines range from small 200 horsepower (150 kW) K4 blocks for SLK roadsters and CLK-Class to the 900 horsepower (670 kW) twin-turbo blocks for the S-Class. The company also provides improvements to the interior from custom upholstery, gauges, shift knobs, pedals, and trim to various electronics such as wider LCD screens for the Maybach.

== Subsidiaries ==
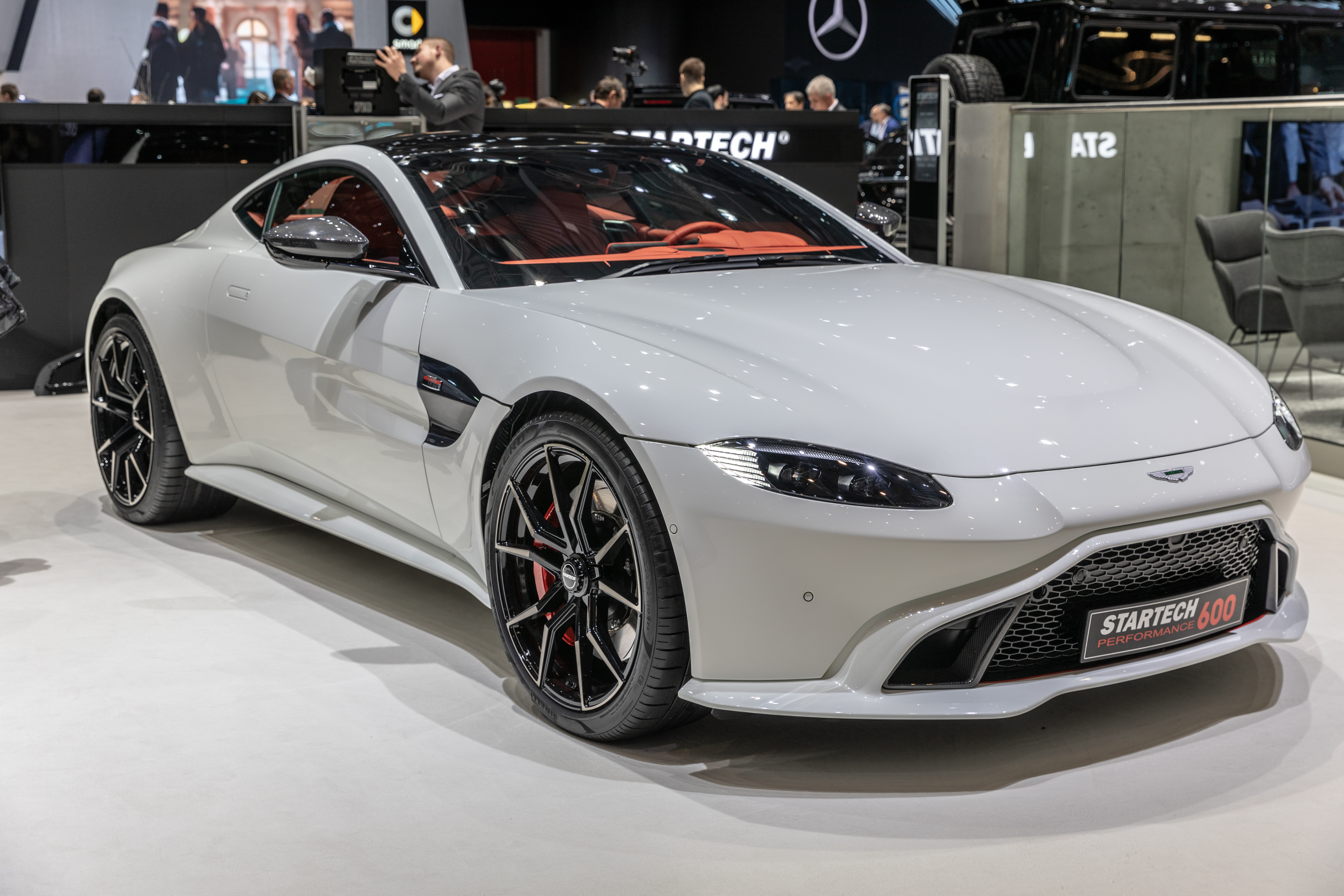
Aston Martin Vantage Startech Performance 600

- smart-BRABUS GmbH: It is a 50-50 joint venture of Daimler AG and BRABUS GmbH, founded in 2001.
- BRABUS Classic: It is a dealer and restorer of older Mercedes-Benz automobiles.
- BRABUS Service GmbH: It is an authorized Mercedes-Benz service partner of Daimler AG.
- BRABUS Yachting: It is a boats and ships customizer.
- BRABUS automotive GmbH: It is a concept vehicle developer. The production facility was in a new plant erected in 2014.
- CRD Car Research & Development GmbH & Co. KG: A developer and producer of special model series and accessories concepts for automobile manufacturers from around the world. It also develops and executes professional marketing strategies to market these components and cars.
- STARTECH: A customizer of Jaguar, Land Rover, and Aston Martin automobiles.
- BRABUS Private Aviation GmbH: An aircraft customizer.
- BRABUS Japan Inc. (BRABUS JAPAN株式会社): BRABUS GmbH's Asia-Pacific partner, and Japanese importer of BRABUS vehicles.
- EXE Corporation (株式会社 エクゼ)/BRABUS EXE: Japanese importer of BRABUS vehicle parts.
- BRABUS International Holdings (HK) Co. Ltd. (巴博斯中国): China importer of BRABUS vehicles.
- BRABUS USA: Importers of BRABUS vehicles for Canada and the United States.
- BRABUS Middle East LLC: Based in Dubai, it is a Middle East dealer of BRABUS vehicles.

== Brabus models ==
The company has built special editions of Mercedes-Benz, Maybach, Rolls-Royce, Porsche, Smart, Bentley, Land Rover, and Lamborghini vehicles.

=== Mercedes-Benz A-Class ===
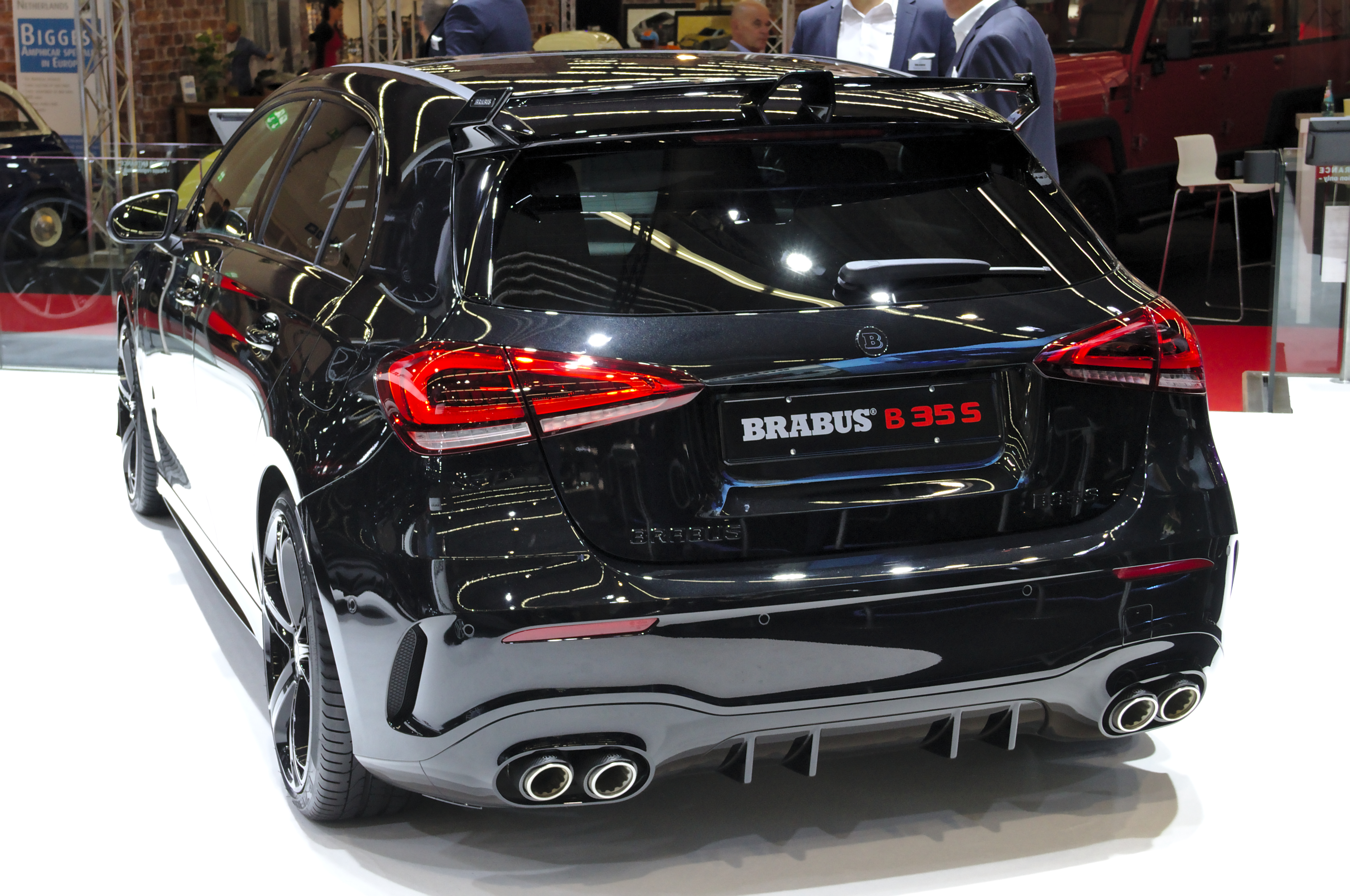
Mercedes-Benz A-Class Brabus W177

- Brabus B18 (Mercedes-Benz A-Class, W177 Platform) 2.0 litre (A 180)
- Brabus B25 S (Mercedes-Benz A-Class, W177 Platform) 2.0 litre (A 250)
- Brabus B35/B35S (Mercedes-Benz A-Class, W177 Platform) 2.0 litre (AMG A 35)
- Brabus B45 (Mercedes-Benz A-Class, W177 Platform) 2.0 litre (AMG A 45/S)

=== Mercedes-Benz B-Class ===
- Brabus D3 (W245)
- Brabus T1 (W245)
- Brabus B-Class (W246)

=== Mercedes-Benz C-Class ===
- Brabus Bullit (Mercedes-Benz C-Class, W204 Platform) 6.3 litre twin turbo V12
- Brabus C V8S (Mercedes-Benz C-Class, W203 Platform) 6.1 litre V8 with enhanced camshaft profiles and higher output
- Brabus C V8 (Mercedes-Benz C-Class, W203 Platform) 5.8 or 6.1 litre V8
- Brabus C V8 Sportscoupe (Mercedes-Benz C-Class, W203 Platform) 6.1 litre V8
- Brabus C 3.8 S (Mercedes-Benz C-Class, W203 Platform) 3.8 litre V6
- Brabus C V8 (Mercedes-Benz C-Class, W202 Platform) 5.8 litre V8
- Brabus C 3.6 (Mercedes-Benz C-Class, W202 Platform) 3.6 litre I6
- Brabus B18 (Mercedes-Benz C-Class, W205 Platform) 2.0 litre I4 turbo (C 180)
- Brabus B20 (Mercedes-Benz C-Class, W205 Platform) 2.0 litre I4 turbo (C 200)
- Brabus B25 (Mercedes-Benz C-Class, W205 Platform) 2.0 litre I4 turbo (C 250)
- Brabus B30 (Mercedes-Benz C-Class, W205 Platform) 2.0 litre I4 turbo (C 300)
- Brabus 410 (Mercedes-Benz C-Class, W205 Platform) 3.0 litre V6 twin-turbo (C 450 4MATIC)
- Brabus 450 (Mercedes-Benz C-Class, W205 Platform) 3.0 litre V6 twin-turbo (AMG C43 4MATIC)
- Brabus D3 (Mercedes-Benz C-Class, W205 Platform) 2.1 litre I4 turbodiesel (C 220 CDI)
- Brabus D3 S (Mercedes-Benz C-Class, W205 Platform) 2.1 litre I4 turbodiesel (C 220d)
- Brabus D4 (Mercedes-Benz C-Class, W205 Platform) 2.1 litre I4 turbodiesel (C 250 BlueTec)
- Brabus D4 S (Mercedes-Benz C-Class, W205 Platform) 2.1 litre I4 turbodiesel (C 250d)
- Brabus D22 (Mercedes-Benz C-Class, W205 Platform) 2.0 litre I4 turbodiesel (C 220d)
- Brabus D30E (Mercedes-Benz C-Class, W205 Platform) 2.0 litre I4 turbodiesel + electric motor (C 300de)
- Brabus 600 (Mercedes-Benz C-Class, W205 Platform) 4.0 litre V8 twin-turbo (AMG C63)
- Brabus 650 (Mercedes-Benz C-Class, W205 Platform) 4.0 litre V8 twin-turbo (AMG C63 S)
- Brabus B30 (Mercedes-Benz C-Class, W206 Platform) 2.0 litre I4 turbo (C 300 4MATIC)
- Brabus D30 (Mercedes-Benz C-Class, W206 Platform) 2.0 litre I4 turbo (C 300d)
- Brabus 730 (Mercedes-Benz C-Class, W206 Platform) 2.0 litre I4 turbo (C63S E Performance)
- Brabus 730 (Mercedes-Benz C-Class, S206 Platform) 2.0 litre I4 turbo (C63S E Performance)

=== Mercedes-Benz CL-Class ===
- Brabus CL 5.8 Coupé (CL500)
- Brabus B11 (CL500)
- Brabus SV12 S Coupé (CL 600)
- Brabus T 13 Coupé (CL 600)
- Brabus 800 Coupé (CL 600)
- Brabus T65S (CL65 AMG)

=== Mercedes-Benz CLK-Class ===
- Brabus CLK500

=== Mercedes-Benz CLS-Class ===
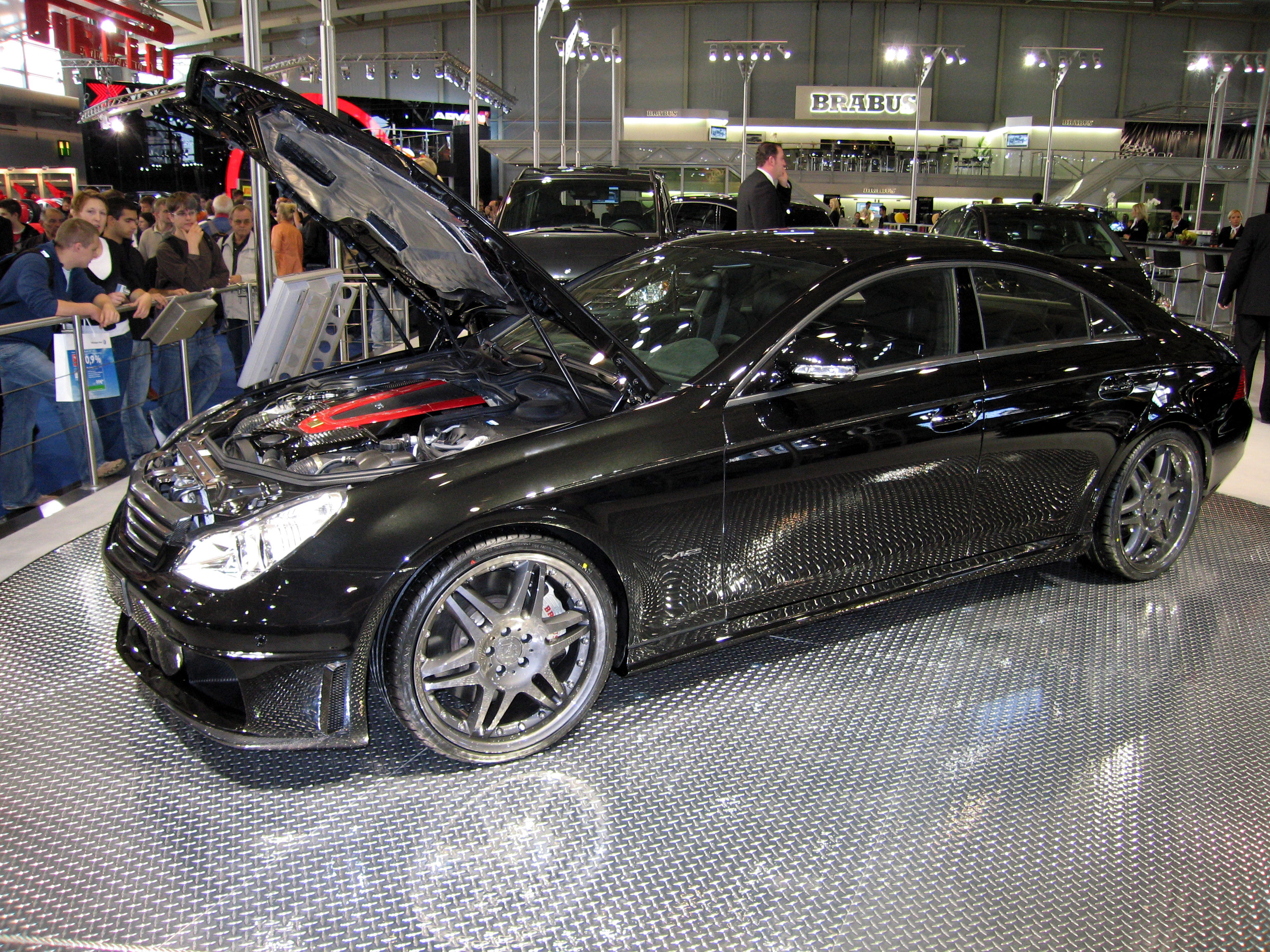
Mercedes-Benz CLS-Class Brabus

- Brabus Rocket (CLS-Class)
- Brabus CLS K8 C219
- Brabus CLS B11
- Brabus CLS D6S POWER DIESEL
- Brabus B63 S
- Brabus CLS 850 6.0 Biturbo

=== Mercedes-Benz E-Class ===
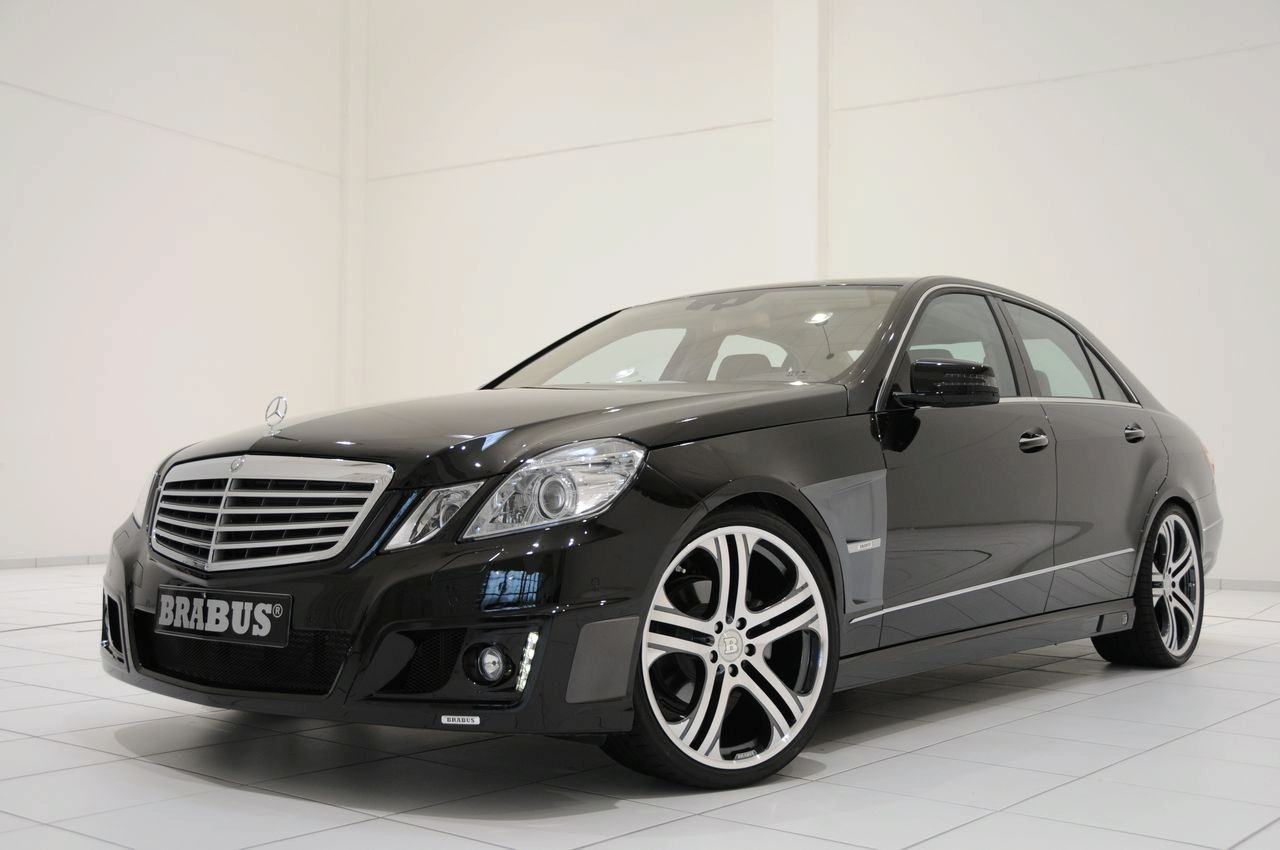
Mercedes-Benz E-Class Brabus W212

- Brabus V8 B11 (W211)
- Brabus E V12 (W210-W211)
- Brabus E V12T- The Mercedes E-Class Wagon-based V12T utilized a 7.3L V12 from the SL73 AMG roadster, the Brabus Sport Wagon had 582 horsepower and 571 lb⋅ft (774 N⋅m) of torque and would seat seven. Brabus used a Mercedes 5-speed automatic to handle the torque, and with rear-wheel drive, it reached sixty in 4.6 seconds.
- Brabus E V12 S BiTurbo (W211)
- Brabus Black Baron (W212)
- Brabus E55 K8 W211 (comes with 6 exhaust pipes)
- Brabus D6 W210-W211 (3 Versions were available, First version was based around the W210 platform with a straight 6 diesel engine tuned by Brabus matched with the Mercedes 5-Speed transmission, the second version based on the W211 platform with the same engine and transmission as the W210 version & the third version based again on the W211 platform with the later 3.0 V6 diesel and 7-Speed automatic transmission (D6S))
- Brabus E55 K8 W210 (HPS supercharger)

=== Mercedes-Benz G-Class ===
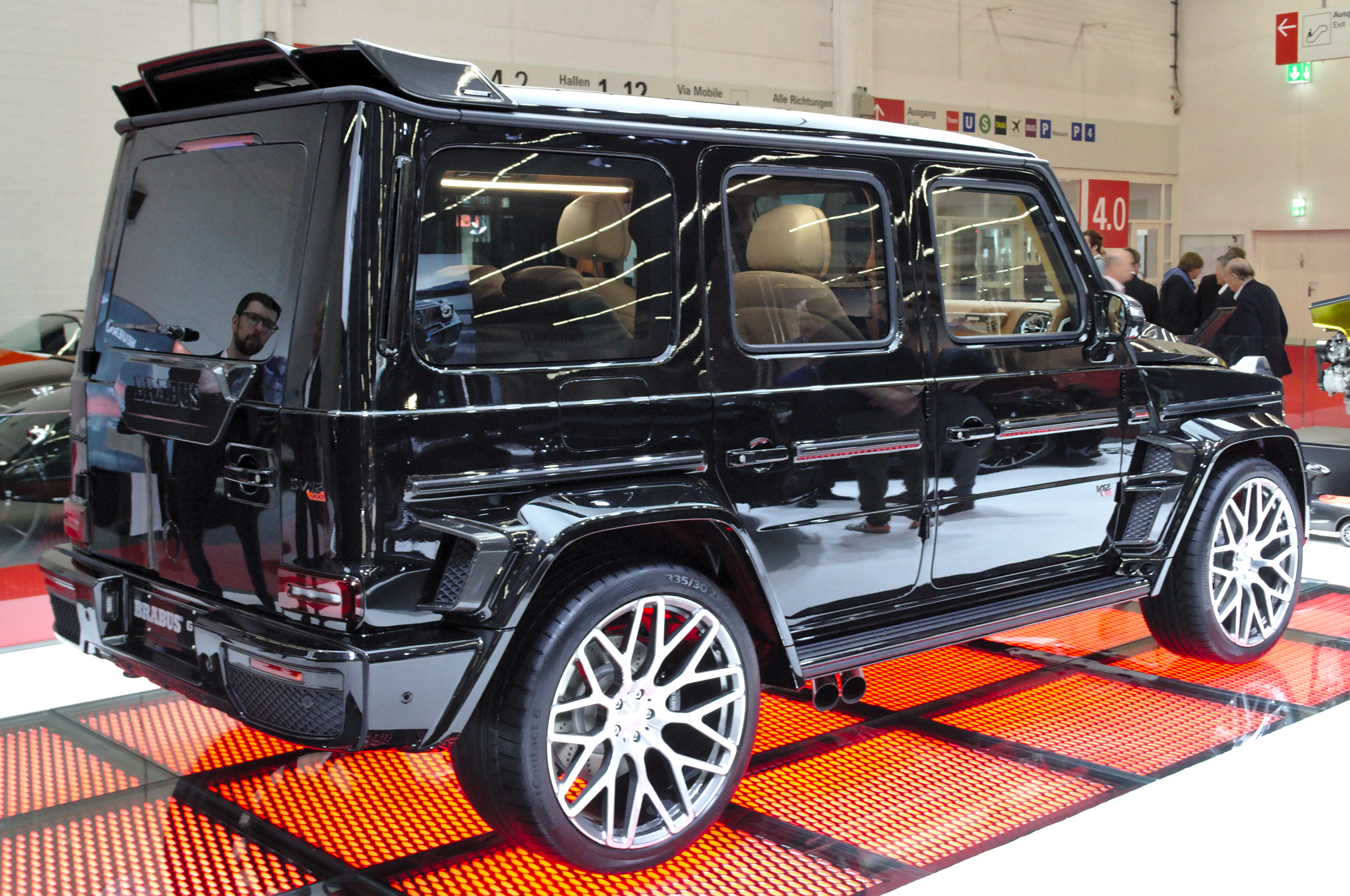
Brabus G 900 V12 "1 OF 10"

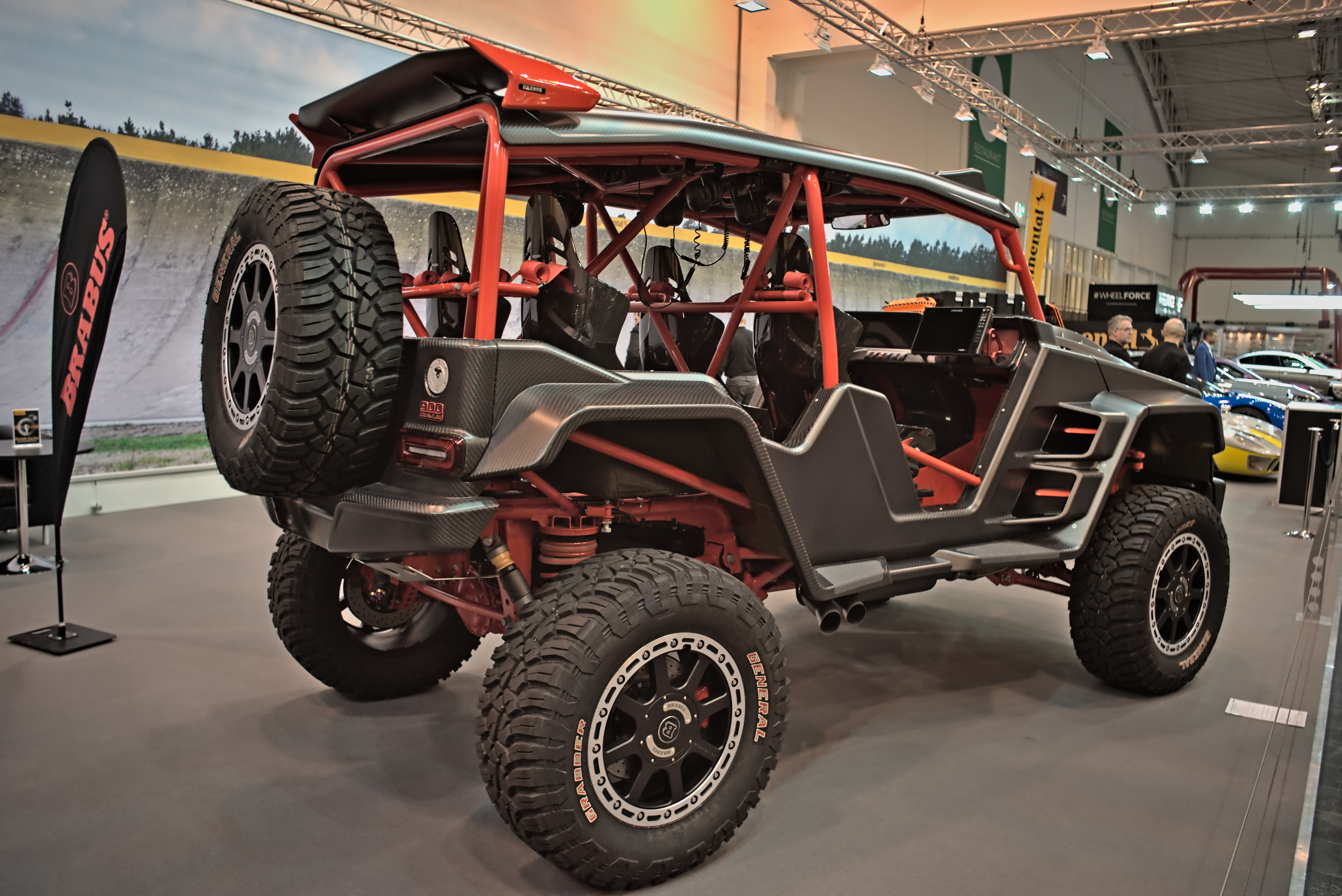
Brabus G CRAWLER "1 OF 15"

- Brabus G 3.6 (G-class)
- Brabus B11 (G500)
- Brabus G55 AMG K8
- Brabus G V12 (G-class)
- Brabus V12 S (G-class)
- Brabus 700 G63 AMG 6x6
- Brabus 700
- Brabus 700 Widestar
- Brabus 800
- Brabus 800 Widestar (G-class) — Brabus 800 Widestar is powered by a four-liter eight-cylinder twin-turbo engine. The top speed is electronically limited to 240 km. Brabus also offers a separate Widestar body kit that can transform modern G-Class SUVs to the Brabus 800 Widestar model.
- Brabus 800 Shadow Edition
- Brabus 800 Black Ops Edition
- Brabus 800 Black & Gold Edition
- Brabus 800 4X4 Edition RHD "1 OF 25"
- Brabus G 900 V12 "1 OF 10"
- Brabus G 900 ROCKET EDITION "1 OF 25"
- Brabus XL 800 (AMG G63 W465)
- Brabus XLP 800 6X6 Adventure
- Brabus G 800 XLP Superwhite (4x4 pickup truck)
- Brabus G 900 XLP "1 OF 10"
- Brabus G P 900 ROCKET EDITION "1 OF 10"(four wheel pickup truck)
- Brabus G CRAWLER "1 OF 15"
- Brabus XLP 900 6X6 (Superblack, Deep Blue)
- Brabus Invicto Luxury - Armoured Vehicle (Mercedes-AMG G 63 [W463A])
- Brabus Invicto Mission - Armoured Vehicle (Mercedes-Benz G500 [W463A])
- Brabus Invicto Pure - Armoured Vehicle (Mercedes-Benz G500 [W463A])

=== Mercedes-Benz GL-Class ===
- Brabus GL D6
- Brabus GL D6S POWER DIESEL
- Brabus GL Widestar 6.1

=== Mercedes-Benz GLC-Class ===
- Brabus 600 (GLC 63S)
- Brabus 730 - GLC 63 S E Performance

=== Mercedes-Benz GLE-Class ===
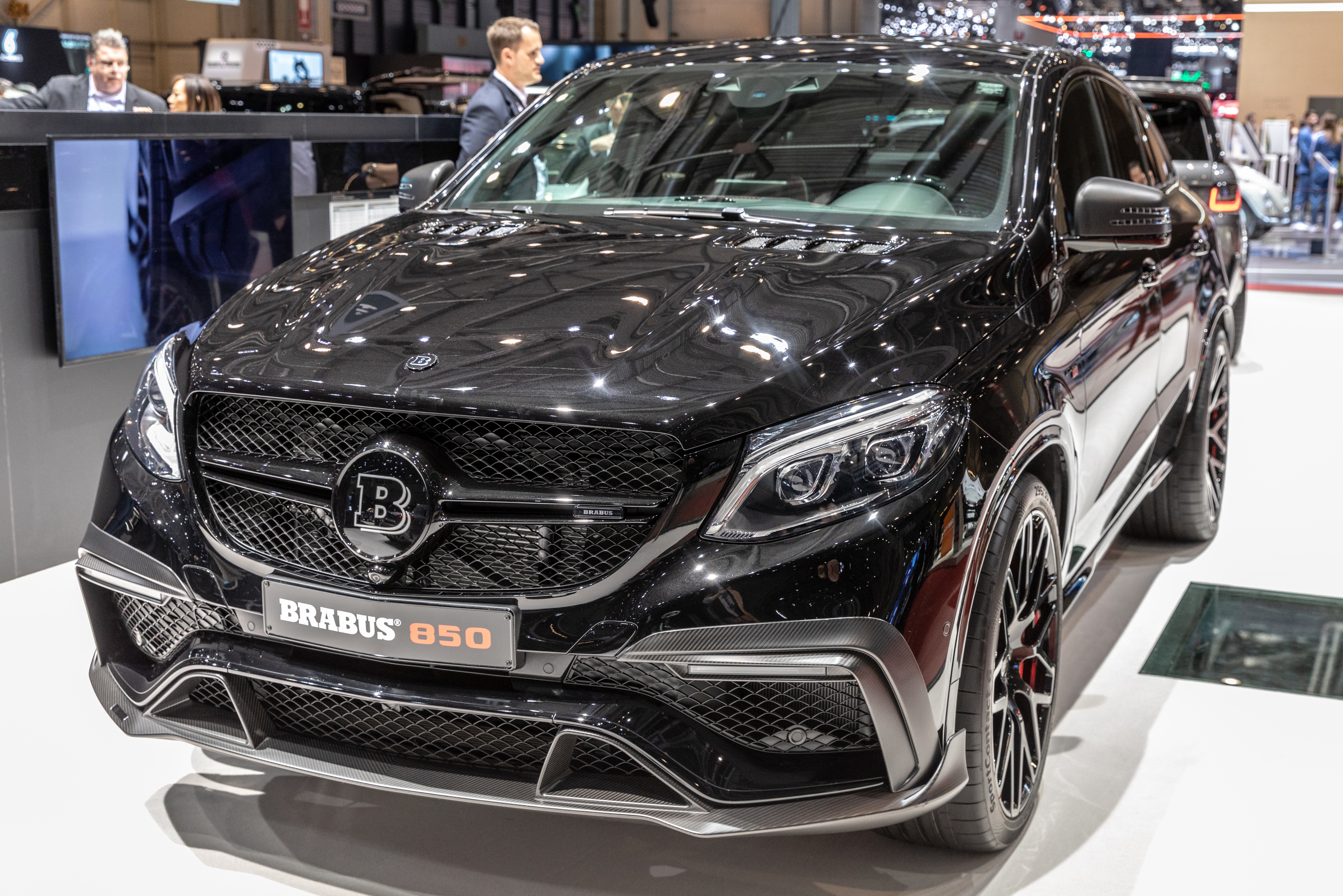
Brabus GLE 850 Coupé (C292)

- Brabus GLE 800
- Brabus GLE 850
- Brabus GLE 900 ROCKET EDITION "1 OF 25"(based from Mercedes-AMG GLE 63 S C167 Coupé, fastest SUV car in the world)

=== Mercedes-Benz GLK-Class ===
- Brabus GLK V8
- Brabus GLK 750 V12 - Guinness world record

=== Mercedes-Benz GLS-Class ===
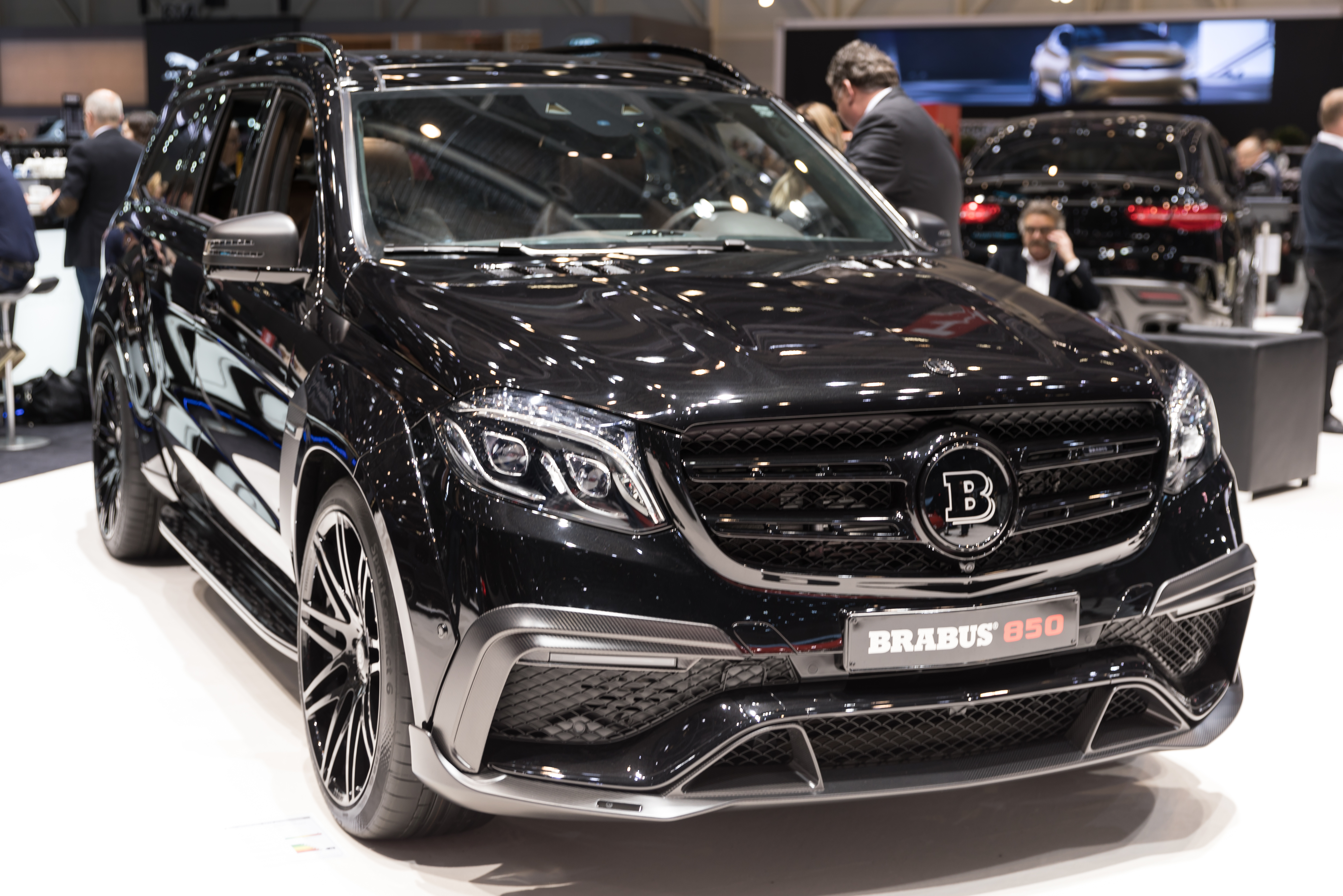
Brabus GLS 850

- Brabus GLS 800
- Brabus GLS 850
- Brabus GLS 900

=== Mercedes-Benz ML-Class ===
- Brabus ML 430 5.8 V8
- Brabus ML 6.1 V8
- Brabus M V12 7.3S (W163) - 1998 Guinness world record
- Brabus D6S POWER DIESEL (W164)
- Brabus ML 63 (W164)

=== Mercedes-Benz S-Class ===
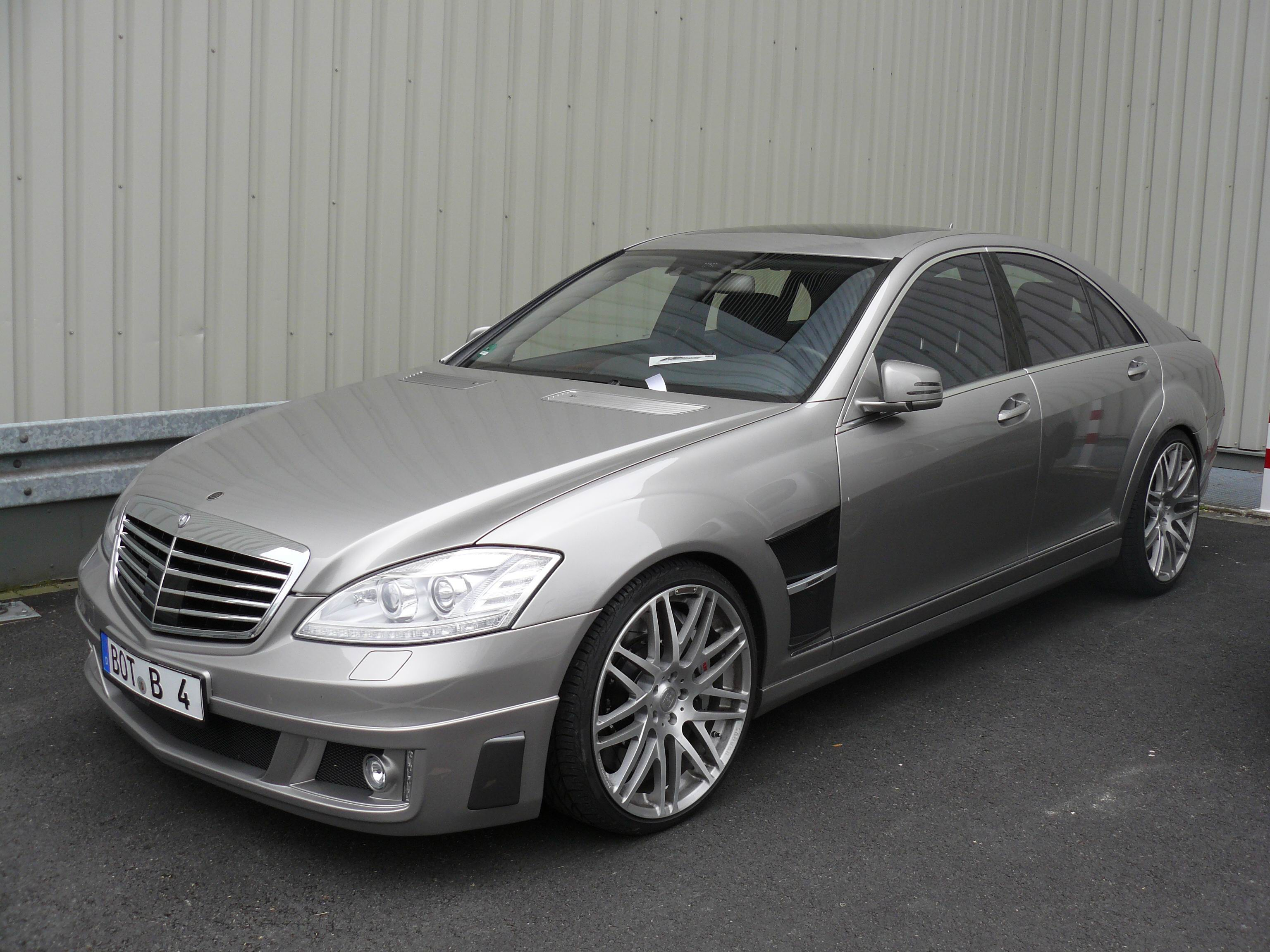
2010 Brabus S-Class

- Brabus B11 (W220)
- Brabus K8 (W220)
- Brabus S 5.8 (W220)
- Brabus S V12 6.7 (W220)
- Brabus 6.7 V12 Business (W220)
- Brabus S500 (5.0l V8)
- Brabus SV12 S BiTurbo Limousine (S600)
- Brabus T 13 Limousine (S600)
- Brabus T65S (S65 AMG)
- Brabus SV12 R (S600) iBusiness (750 hp)
- Brabus SV12 R (S600) iBusiness/ Limousine (800 hp)
- Brabus 850 S63 AMG iBusiness/ Limousine (850 hp)
- Brabus S500 (W223)
- Brabus Rocket 900
- Brabus 930 (S 63 E Performance)
- Brabus 1000

=== Mercedes-Benz SL-Class, SLK-Class and SLS-Class ===
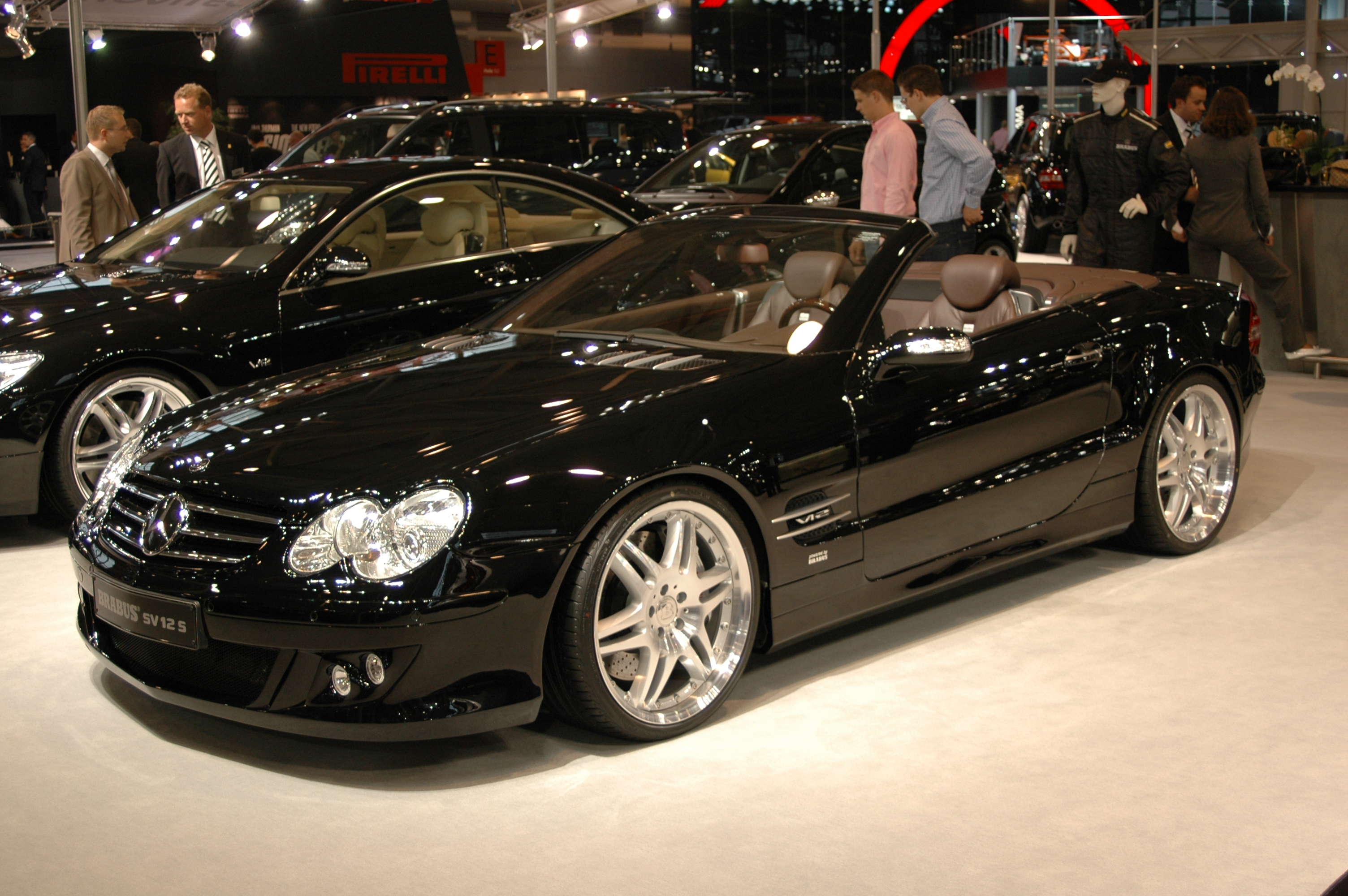
Mercedes-Benz SL-Class Brabus (01-08)

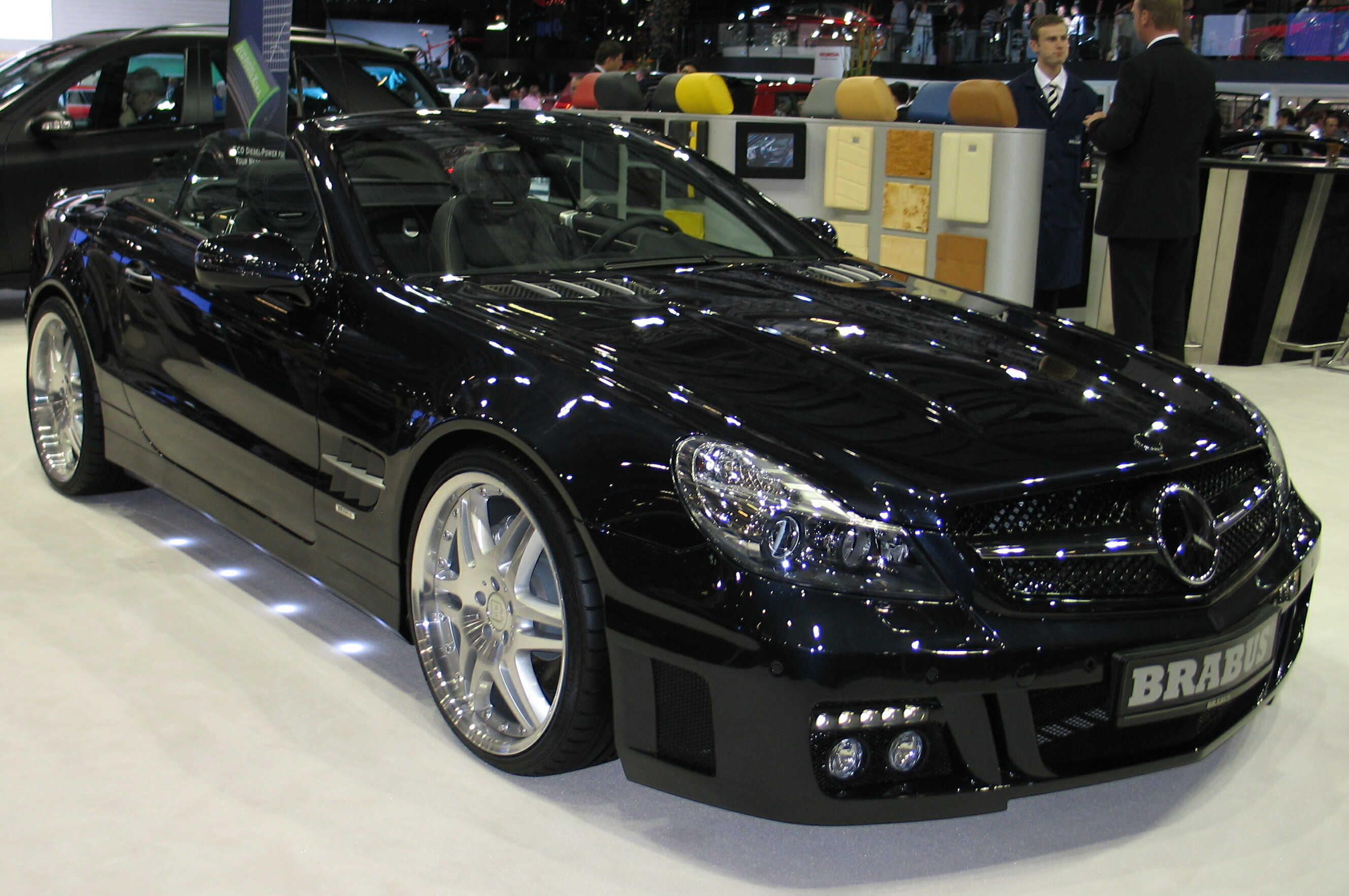
Mercedes-Benz SL-Class Brabus

The Brabus K8 performance kit for the SL model (SL55) includes modifications to the supercharger incorporating a custom vibration damper and pulley, high-performance metal catalysts, and an auxiliary circulation pump with an opposing radiator. Power is increased from a standard 476 hp (355 kW) to 550 hp (410 kW) at 6,200 rpm. The maximum torque is 780 N⋅m (580 lb⋅ft) at 3,000 rpm. The roadster is claimed to reach 60 mph (97 km/h) in 4.1 seconds, passes 120 mph (190 km/h) after 13.6 seconds and reaches an electronically limited top speed of 186 mph (299 km/h).

- Brabus B11 (SL500)
- Brabus SV12 BiTurbo Roadster (SL600)
- Brabus SV12 S BiTurbo Roadster (SL600)
- Brabus T 13 Roadster (SL600)
- Brabus T65S (SL65 AMG)
- Brabus T65 RS (SL65 AMG Black Series)
- Brabus SL 55 K8 Roadster (SL55)
- Brabus SL 65 Roadster AMG (Daniel Madar)
- Brabus 750 (Mercedes-AMG SL 63)
- Brabus 750 Bodo Buschmann Edition "1 OF 25" (Mercedes-AMG SL 63)
- Brabus Rocket GTS (SL63S E Performance)
- Brabus Rocket GTC (SL63S E Performance)
- Brabus SLK 3.8S (SLK 320)
- Brabus SLK 6.5 (6.5L V8)
- Brabus SLS
- Brabus SLS Roadster
- Brabus SLS 700 BiTurbo

=== Mercedes-McLaren SLR ===
- Brabus SLR McLaren (660 hp)
- Brabus SLR McLaren Roadster

=== Mercedes-AMG GT 4-Door ===
- Brabus 800
- Brabus Rocket 900 "ONE OF TEN"
- Brabus 930
- Brabus Rocket 1000 "1 OF 25"

=== Mercedes-Benz Viano ===
- Brabus 6.1 V8

=== Maybach ===
- Brabus SV12 S (Maybach 57(S) / 62(S))

=== Smart ForTwo ===
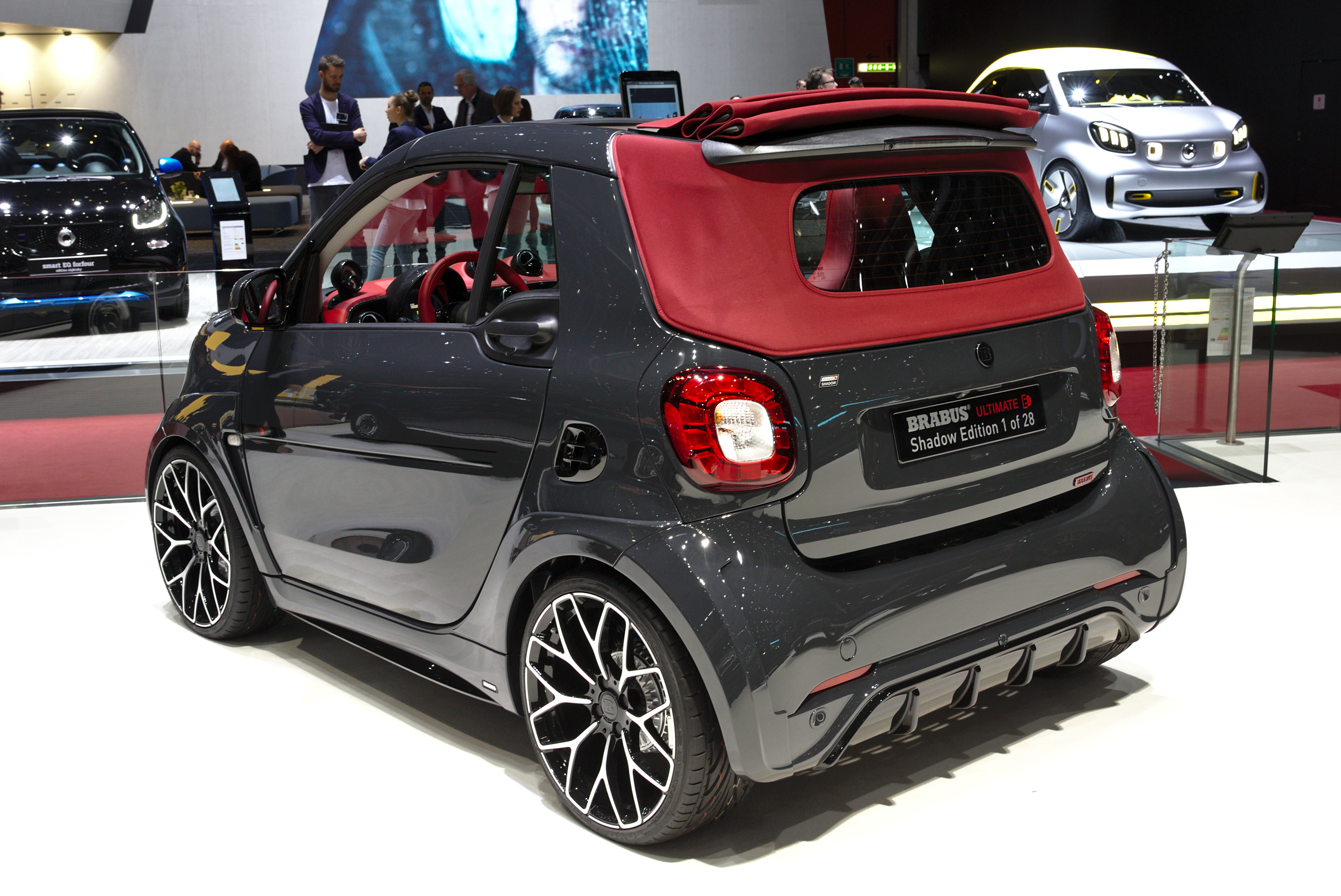
Smart ForTwo Brabus

- Brabus Fortwo Edition Red - 35 Coupé and 15 Cabrio models.

Between 2006 and 2007 Brabus produced and sold 50 Smart Fortwo Edition Red cars for the UK market. All of these vehicles were originally produced with a black Tridion safety cell and black plastic panels, the car was then later repainted at Brabus in (EB6 colour code) Intense Red. The car was built with the usual Brabus additions to the exterior, these being Brabus front grille (with fog lights), Brabus front splitter, Brabus side skirts, black plastic Brabus rear exhaust panel, and 16-inch Brabus Monoblock alloy wheels. These vehicles were always rumoured to be Brabus Nightrun Fortwo's that were later reworked.

The interior was bespoke to this limited run of vehicles. The interior is half leather and half alcantara with red stitching. The seats use the smaller, non-sport foams. This is unusual as all other Brabus 450 Fortwo's use wider sports-style seat foams. The door card inserts are alcantara with leather door pockets with the dashboard finished in alcantara with an aluminium Brabus plaque displayed in the centre. None of these vehicles had heated seats or electric wing mirrors. All Brabus Edition Red Fortwo's are equipped with a 3-spoke steering wheel, bespoke floor mats, air conditioning, CD player, Brabus clock and rev counter, Brabus speedo displaying 120 mph, and all of the removable interior plastics (including door handles and steering wheel trim) repainted in Intense Red to match the exterior.

Designed on the base of the Fortwo Brabus, this limited edition example is powered by a 55kW 3-cylinder turbocharged engine although all of the upgraded hardware is from the 60kW motor with a different tune. Brabus upgrades over a standard 698cc Smart Fortwo include a 60kW camshaft, 60kW yellow Bosch injectors, 60kW turbocharger, 60kW turbo to intercooler pipe (TIK), Brabus branded central twin outlet exhaust with chrome tips, aluminium Brabus intake manifold name plaque and the gearbox from a Smart Roadster (different gear ratios compared with a standard Smart Fortwo).

- Brabus Canada 1 (smart fortwo 450 cdi coupé and convertible) - 4 made for Canada (3 red EB6), 1 white).
- Brabus edit10n (smart fortwo 451 70 HP coupé) - 10 made for Canada - all Grey metallic/tan leather
- Brabus Ultimate 112 (smart fortwo convertible)
- Brabus electric drive (smart fortwo electric vehicle)

=== Smart Roadster ===
- Smart Roadster Coupé Racing RCR Edition 50 made by Brabus
- Smart roadster Brabus (slight hatchback design)
- Smart roadster-coupe Brabus
- Smart roadster-coupe Brabus biturbo - 10 made

=== Smart ForFour ===
- Smart forfour Brabus
- Smart forfour Brabus Hugo Boss special edition - 5 pcs.

=== Rolls-Royce Ghost ===
- Brabus 700 (Rolls-Royce Ghost) 2nd Generation 6.75 liter V12
- Brabus 700 (Rolls-Royce Cullinan)

=== Porsche ===
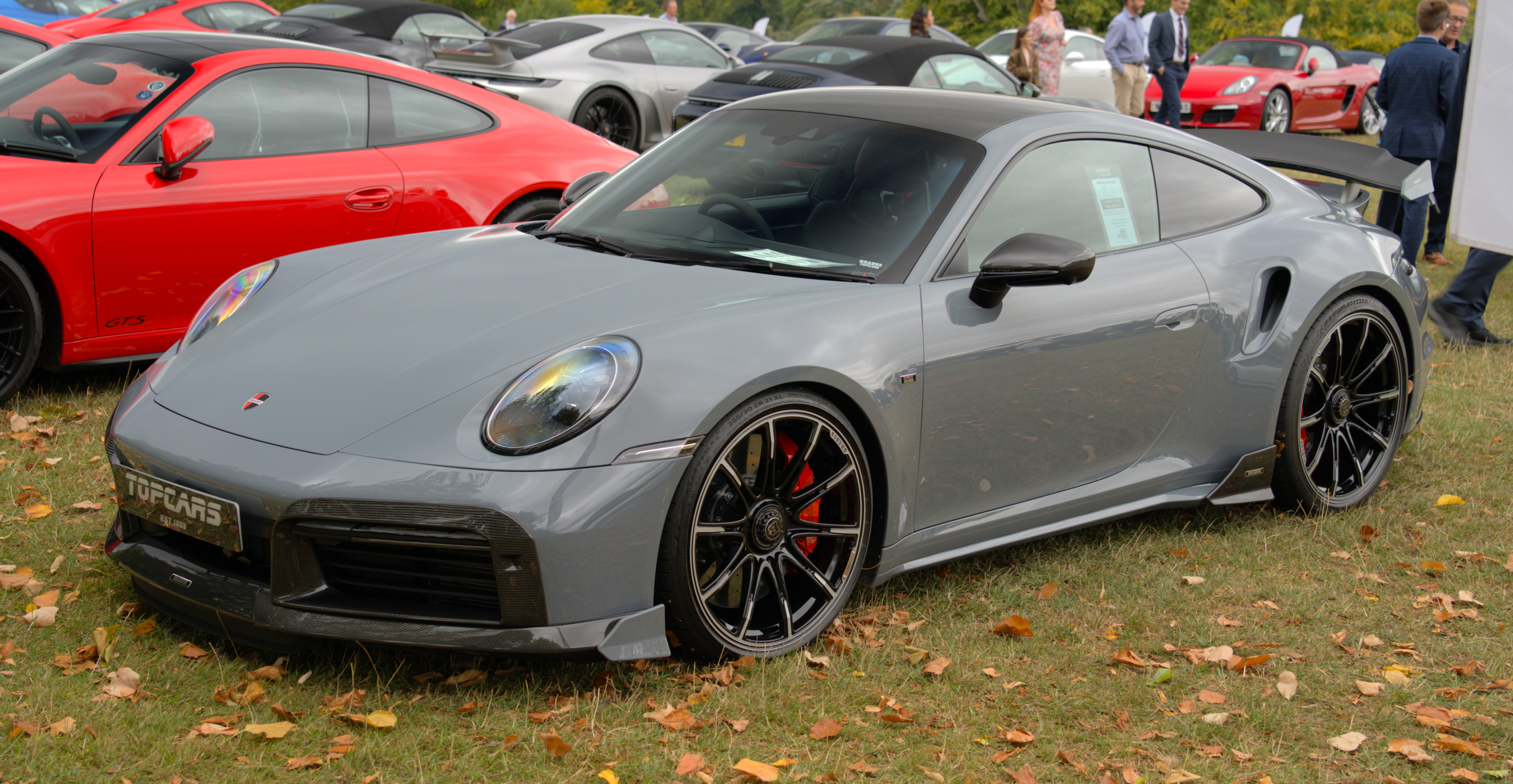
Brabus 820 based on the 992

- Brabus Taycan Turbo S
- Brabus 720 (Porsche 911 Turbo S)
- Brabus 820 (Porsche 911 Turbo S)
- Brabus 900 (Peetch & Deep Blue) (Porsche 911 Turbo S Convertible)
- Brabus for Porsche Taycan Turbo S
- Brabus 900 Rocket R (Porsche 911 Turbo S Coupé)

=== KTM ===
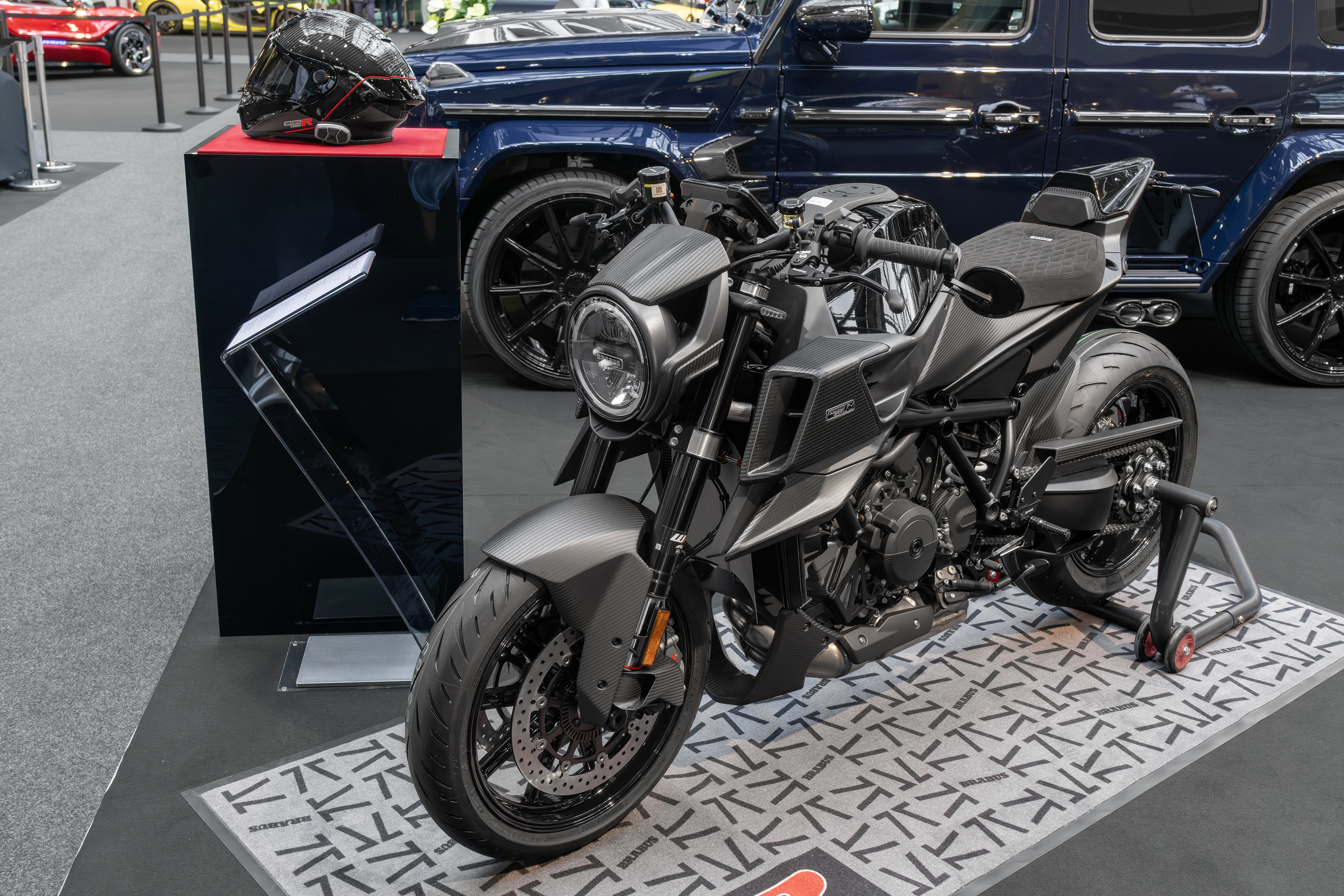
Brabus 1300R Edition 23

- Brabus 1300R
- Brabus 1300R Edition 23

=== Range Rover ===
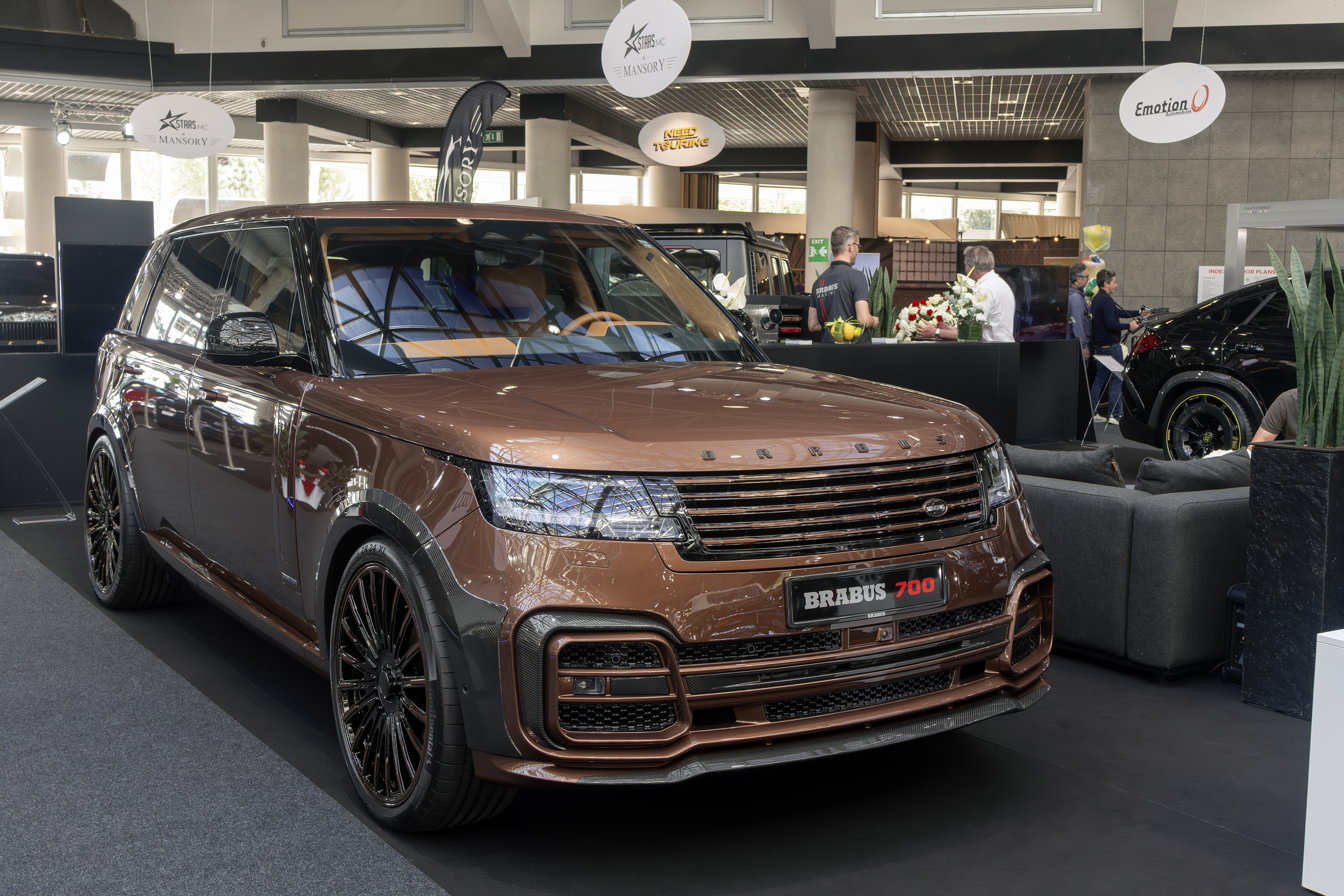
Brabus 700 P615 SV

- Brabus 600 (P530)

Based on the Range Rover P530

- Brabus 700 P615 SV

Based on the Range Rover P615 SV

=== Unimog ===
- Brabus U500 Black edition

Based on the Unimog 405.

=== Mercedes-Benz Actros ===
- Big Boy 1200 Motorhome

=== Lamborghini Urus SE ===
- Brabus 900 (Mint and Superblack)

=== Bentley Continental GT & GTC Speed ===
- Brabus 900 (convertible and coupe)

=== Aston Martin ===
On May 2026, Brabus unveiled at 2026 Concorso d'Eleganza Villa d'Este the first own model, the Bodo, based on the Aston Martin Vanquish. Paying tribute to the founder of the brand, Bodo Buschmann, only 77 vehicles will be produced with a price starting at 1.2 million euros.

== Collaborations ==
- Panerai

Announced in September 2021, Brabus and the luxury watchmaker Panerai announced a collaboration to make the "Panerai Submersible S Brabus Black Ops Edition". They announced three colors for this model Blue Shadow Edition, Experience Edition (Red), and a Verde Military Edition (Military Green).

- KTM

In a collaboration between Brabus and the motorcycle manufacturer KTM, Brabus modified the KTM 1290 Super Duke R EVO under the name Brabus 1300R.

- Smart

With the launch of the Smart #1, Brabus and Smart worked together to create the Smart #1 Brabus, which represents a sportier variant of the Smart #1.

== Records ==
- In 2006 Brabus Rocket clocked in new record for street-legal sedan at 362.4 km/h (225.2 mph). The Rocket was based on a modified Mercedes-Benz CLS-Class (W219) model.
- In October 2006 Brabus made another record (for a sedan) with this car at 365.7 km/h (227.2 mph). The price of the car is 348,000 euros.
- A world-record speed of 330.6 km/h (205.2 mph) set on the high-speed test track in Nardo, Italy; Brabus added to its extensive collection of automotive records with a Maybach 57 powered by a 730-hp (720 hp SAE net) / 537-kW Brabus SV12 S Biturbo engine(s).
- In the beginning of 2012, the world's fastest street-legal sedan was a Brabus Rocket 800.

The 2012 Brabus Rocket 800 is powered by a V12 engine rated at 800 hp and 1,420Nm of torque, which has been limited to 1,100Nm. The Brabus Rocket accelerates from 0 to 100 km/h (62 mph) in 3.7 seconds, 23.8 seconds to 300 km/h (186 mph) and has a top speed of 370 km/h (230 mph).

== See also ==
- Protean Electric
- Alpina, similar marque specializing on high-performance BMW models.
- ABT, similar marque specializing on high-performance Audi models.
