= BEDEO =

UK company

- Formerly: BD Auto
- Industry: Automotive
- Founded: 2009
- Founder: Osman Boyner
- Headquarters: London, United Kingdom
- Area served: Worldwide
- Products: Electric vehicles
- Website: bedeo.co.uk

BEDEO (formerly known as BD Auto) is a British electric vehicle supplier and manufacturer. Founded by Osman Boyner in Turkey in 2009, BEDEO is focused on the production of pure electric lightweight commercial vehicles and passenger models and has more than 400 vehicles in operation in seven European countries such as Denmark, the Netherlands, the United Kingdom and Italy.

== History ==
BEDEO was founded in Turkey in 2009 by Osman Boyner. In 2011, Turkish shipping company Aras Kargo decided to include electric vehicles in their fleet. After an initial trial, Aras Kargo added an extra 30 vehicles to their fleet in 2014, making it Turkey's largest fleet of fully electric commercial vehicles.

In 2015, BEDEO went on to partner with TNT in the Netherlands, and also formed partnerships with DHL and FedEx.

BEDEO began offering its range of electric vans in the UK in 2017, with UK supermarket Ocado acquiring 15 Fiat chassis from BEDEO in 2018.

Groupe PSA announced it would be supplying and installing BEDEO electric drivetrain solutions to a selection of their light commercial vehicle models, including refrigerated delivery trucks.

== Vehicles ==
BEDEO uses base vehicles from major OEMs – ranging from 3–4.25 tonnes GVW – converted to electric-only operation, with the 62kwh battery stored under the chassis and the interior modified with a meter showing ‘state of charge’ and range. Working range is around 100 miles for the smaller van and 125 miles for the larger one, based on the company's own real-world tests with a half payload.

BD Auto offers two models, a smaller BD e-Trafic and a larger BD e-Ducato.

Vans are eligible for the government's Plug-in Van Grant, are also exempt from paying London's congestion charge and ULEZ charge.
