= Brabus Bullit =

German automobile

The Brabus Bullit is an automobile designed and made by Brabus.

== BRABUS Bullit (2007?–) ==
Brabus Bullit
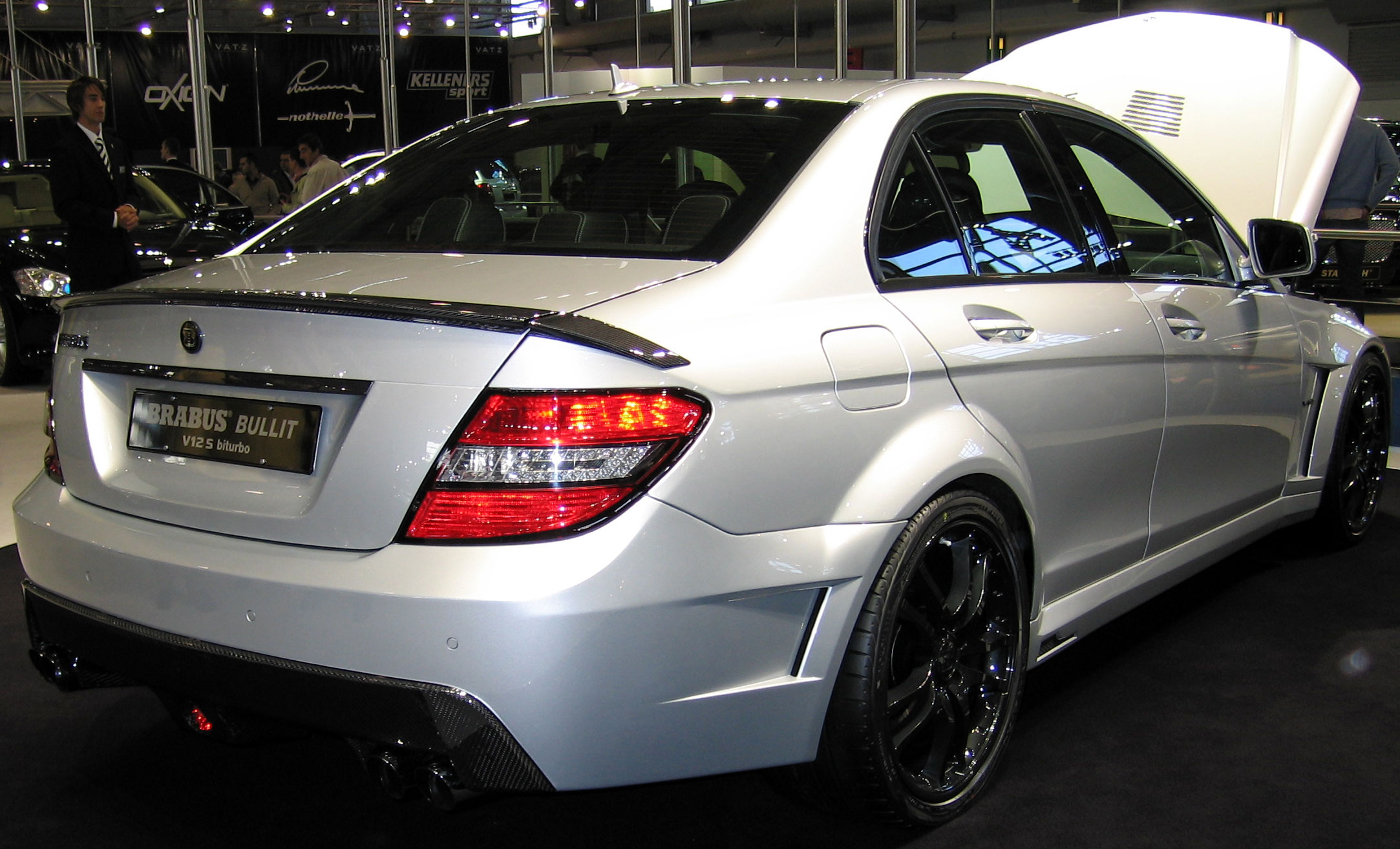

Overview
- Manufacturer: Brabus

Body and chassis
- Class: sport compact executive car
- Body style: 4-door saloon
- Layout: FR layout
- Related: Mercedes-Benz C-Class

Powertrain
- Engine: 6.2 L twin turbo V12

Based on the Mercedes-Benz C-Class W 204 series sedan, the Bullit includes metal catalysts with low back pressure, a custom stainless-steel exhaust system, new engine electronics with custom mapping and on-board diagnostics system, ARAL Synthetic motor oil, redesigned front carbon fiber apron, a three-piece carbon fiber rear spoiler, carbon fiber rear apron with integrated diffuser, aluminum hood with ventilation slots, BRABUS rocker panels, aluminum fender flares front and back, YOKOHAMA ADVAN 265/30 ZR 19 front and 285/30 ZR 19 tires, BRABUS Monoblock S 9.5Jx19 front and 10Jx19 rear light-alloy wheels, height-adjustable BRABUS coil-over suspension with ten selectable settings each, sport sway bars, 380 mm × 37 mm (14.96 in × 1.46 in) vented and grooved steel front brake discs with 12-piston aluminum fixed front calipers, 360 mm × 28 mm (14.17 in × 1.10 in) vented and grooved steel rear brake discs with 6-piston aluminum fixed rear calipers, Mastik and Nubuk interior leather upholstery, carbon-fiber rear seat covers, carbon-fiber components on dashboard, center console and door panels; sport steering wheel and aluminum pedals and shifter.

The vehicle was unveiled at the 2007 Frankfurt Motor Show.

The vehicle went on sale for 348,000 euros.

=== BRABUS Bullit Black Arrow (2008–) ===
Based on the BRABUS BULLIT, the Bullit Black Arrow includes a matte-black body colour, BRABUS Monoblock S 9.5J×19 front and 10J×19 rear light-alloy wheels finished in matte-black and an option of YOKOHAMA or Pirelli 265/30 ZR 19 front and 285/30 ZR 19 rear tires.

The vehicle went on sale for 348,000 euro (US$542,549.60).

=== Engine ===
Type	Power, torque@rpm
6,233 cc (6.233 L; 380.4 cu in) V12 twin turbo (BRABUS SV12 S)	730 PS (537 kW; 720 hp)@5100, 1,320 N⋅m (974 lb⋅ft)@2100, electronically limited to 1,100 N⋅m (811 lb⋅ft)@2100 SAE net: 720 PS (530 kW; 710 hp)@5100

The engine was modified from a 5.5L V12 engine block (Mercedes-Benz M275). Emission is EURO IV compliant.

=== Performance ===
Accelerations (km/h)			Top speed
0-100	0-200	0-300	Top speed
3.9	10.49	24.5	over 360 km/h (224 mph)

== BRABUS BULLIT Coupé 800 (2012–) ==
BRABUS BULLIT Coupé 800
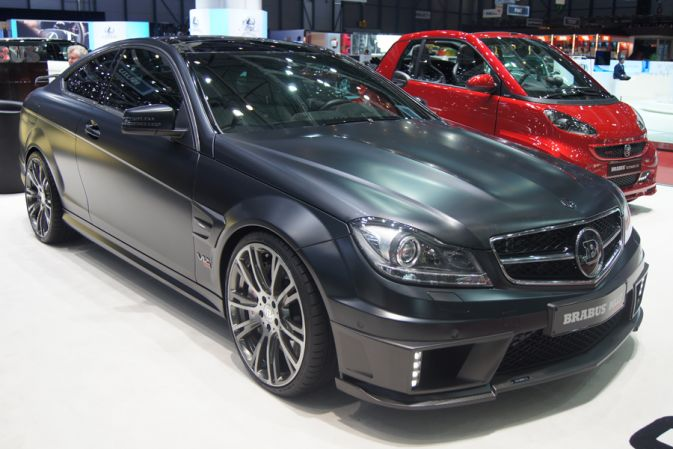
- Brabus Bullit 800 at the 2012 Geneva Motor Show

Overview
- Manufacturer: Brabus
- Also called: Brabus Bullit 800

Body and chassis
- Class: sport compact executive car
- Body style: 2-door coupe
- Layout: FR layout
- Related: Mercedes-Benz C-Class

Powertrain
- Engine: 6.2 L twin turbo V12

Based on the Mercedes-Benz C-Class coupe, it includes height-adjustable Bilstein coil-over suspension with ten settings, upgraded anti-roll bars, carbon-fiber lower spoilers in the front and rear, tail wing, BRABUS Monoblock R wheels (20×8.5-inch front, 20×9.5-inch rear), Continental/Pirelli/YOKOHAMA 235/30 ZR 20 and 275/25 ZR 20 tires, 380 mm × 37 mm (14.96 in × 1.46 in) vented and grooved steel front brake discs with 12-piston aluminum fixed front calipers, 360 mm × 28 mm (14.17 in × 1.10 in) vented and grooved steel rear brake discs with six-piston aluminum fixed rear calipers, black leather and Alcantara interior upholstery with red contrasting seams, carbon-fiber interior trim on the dashboard, center console and door trim; BRABUS sport steering wheel, aluminum pedals and shifter and MOTUL synthetic motor oil.

The vehicle was unveiled at the 2012 Geneva Motor Show.

The vehicle went on sale for €378,000 (US$495,000), with vehicles built from C 63 AMG Black Series being lighter than the other C-Class coupes.

=== Engine ===
Type	Power, torque@rpm
6,233 cc (6.233 L; 380.4 cu in) (6,300 cc (6.3 L; 384.4 cu in)?) V12 twin turbo (BRABUS SV12 S?)	800 PS (588 kW; 789 hp)@5500, 1,420 N⋅m (1,047 lb⋅ft)@2100, electronically limited to 1,100 N⋅m (811 lb⋅ft)@?

The engine was modified from a 5.5L V12 engine block (Mercedes-Benz M275?). Emission is EURO V-compliant.

=== Transmission ===
All models include a reinforced, seven-speed quick-shift automatic gearbox as well as a BRABUS limited-slip differential with a locking rate of 40 percent.

=== Performance ===
Accelerations (km/h)			Top speed
0-100	0-200	0-300	Top speed
3.7	9.8	23.8	over 370 km/h (230 mph)

== See also ==
- Brabus CV 8
- Brabus Rocket
- Mercedes C-Class
- Mercedes CLS
