= Volvo Recharge =

Volvo Cars Recharge

Overview
- Manufacturer: Volvo Cars
- Production: Across Range (2020–present)

Body and chassis
- Class: Across Range
- Related: Across Range

Powertrain
- Engine: Across Range
- Transmission: Across Range

Volvo Cars Recharge is the overarching range name for all cars by Volvo with any form of electric charging system, including both fully electric and plug in hybrid powertrains. The Recharge nameplate appears on the rear-side columns of the cars in the same way as the Momentum, R Design, and Inscription trim ranges are marked.

Volvo Cars intends to launch a fully electric car every year, with the aim of such cars comprising half of its global sales by 2025; the other half will be hybrids. The models of the Volvo C40, XC40, XC60, S60, V60, XC90, S90 and V90 all have one option of Recharge available.

In 2021, Volvo announced upgraded powertrains for their Recharge range. This new change is reflected in their 60- and 90-series models. The models have a larger battery pack, from 11.6 to 18.8 kWh (42 to 68 MJ), giving owners up to 90 kilometres (56 mi) of pure EV range (model dependant), compared with the previous range of 50 kilometres (31 mi).

For the Recharge T6, combined power is now rated at 350 horsepower (261 kW; 355 PS) whilst the more powerful Recharge T8 gets a maximum combined power output of 455 horsepower (339 kW; 461 PS).

== XC40 Recharge ==
The model XC40 Recharge is Volvo's first all-electric car. The design is largely based on the existing internal combustion engine powered XC40 but with the removal of the traditional front grille and the tailpipe. Autocar conducted a test drive in October 2020.

The car is powered by a battery pack supplied by either LG Chem or CATL, depending on the factory in which the car is made. It offers a range of over 400 kilometres (250 mi) on a single charge under the WLTP drive cycle and a power output of 408 horsepower (304 kW; 414 PS). The battery can charge to 80% of its capacity in 40 minutes on a fast charger. The battery pack is placed in the floor of the car, and encased in an aluminium safety cage that creates a crumple zone around the battery.

The XC40 Recharge contains an infotainment system, which was created in collaboration with Google. The native Android system features apps including Google Assistant, Google Maps and the Google Play Store. The system can be fully voice controlled and receives continuous, real-time software and operating system updates.

== See also ==
- Volvo C30 DRIVe Electric
- Volvo V70 Plug in Hybrid (demonstrator)
