= Centrifugal pendulum absorber =

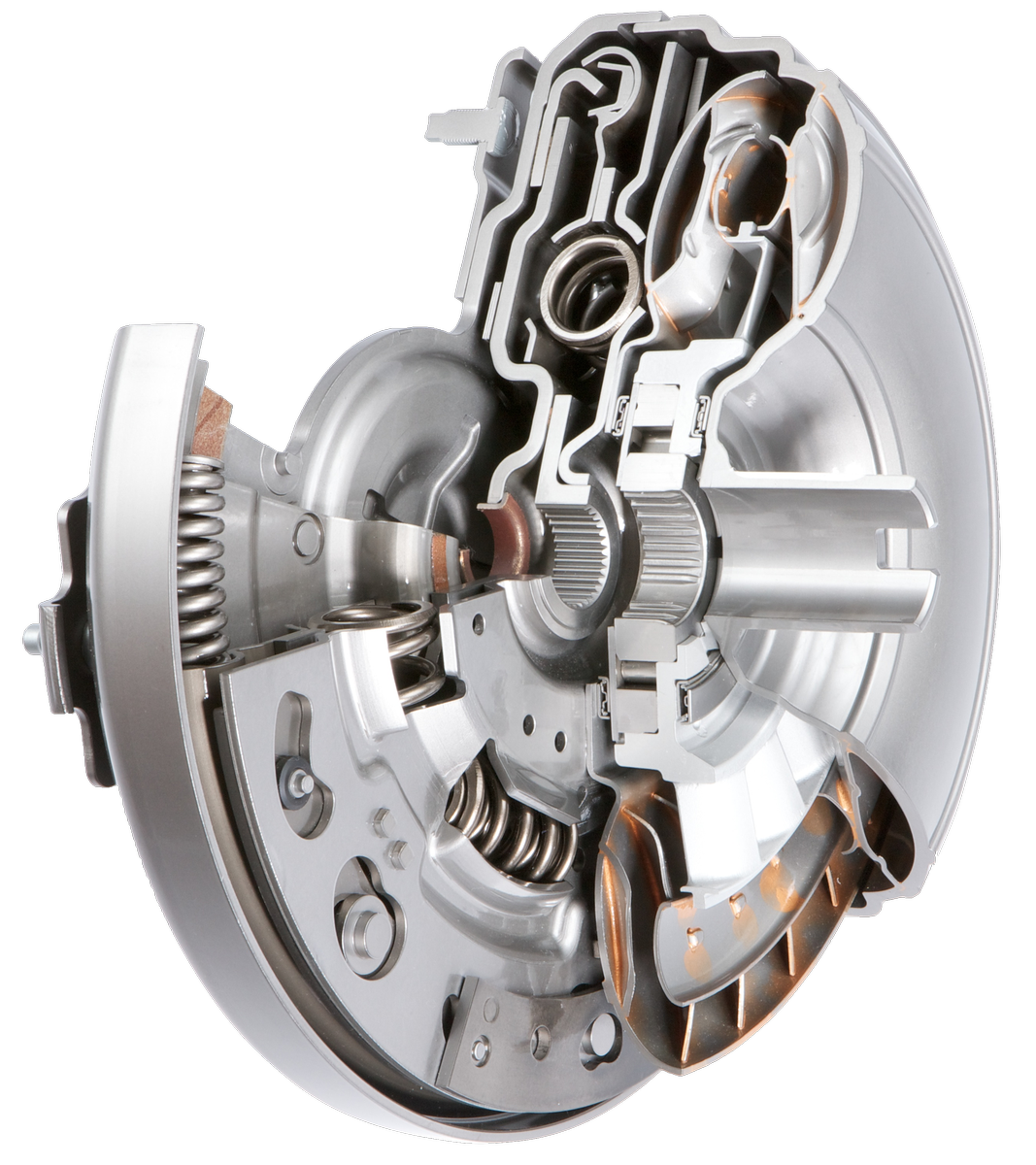
Cross section of a Schaeffler torque converter with centrifugal pendulum absorber

A centrifugal pendulum absorber is a type of tuned mass damper. It reduces the amplitude of a torsional vibration in drive trains that use a combustion engine.

== History ==
The centrifugal pendulum absorber was first patented in 1937 by R. Sarazin and a different version by R. Chilton in 1938. Generally, both Sarazin and Chilton are credited with the invention. Sarazin's work was used during World War II by Pratt & Whitney for aircraft engines with increased power output. The power increase caused an increase in torsional vibrations which threatened the durability. This resulted in the Pratt & Whitney R-2800 engine that used pendulum weights attached to the crank shaft.

The use of centrifugal pendulum absorbers in land vehicles did not start until later. Although internal combustion engines had always caused torsional vibrations in the drive train, the vibration amplitude was generally not high enough to affect durability or driver comfort. One application existed in tuned racing engines where torsional crank shaft vibrations could cause damage to the cam shaft or valves. In this application a centrifugal pendulum absorber is directly attached to the crank shaft.

In 2010, centrifugal pendulum absorbers following the patents of Sarazin and Chilton were introduced in the BMW 320D. The reason for it was again the increase in torsional vibrations from higher power engines, in this case, the BMW N47 4-cylinder diesel engine. Unlike the previous designs, the centrifugal pendulum absorber was not attached to the combustion engine but attached to a dual mass flywheel.

== Function ==
The function of a centrifugal pendulum absorber is as with any tuned mass absorbers based on an absorption principle rather than a damping principle. The distinction is significant since dampers reduce the vibration amplitude by converting the vibration energy into heat. Absorbers store the energy and return it to the vibration system at the appropriate time. Centrifugal pendulum absorbers like tuned mass absorbers are not part of the force/torque flow.

The centrifugal pendulum absorber differs from the tuned mass absorber in the absorption range. It is effective for an entire order instead of a narrow frequency range.

== Modern applications ==
Internal combustion engines follow a development trend towards being more efficient. Aspects of making an engine design more efficient include reducing its number of cylinders, increasing energy output per cylinder, and driving at lower engine speeds. This leads to an increased engine efficiency but causes the engine's torsional vibrations to increase. The vibrations lead to durability concerns as well as a comfort reduction for the passengers and have to be avoided through the use of harmonic dampers and absorbers. This situation moves the balance between the cost of the centrifugal pendulum absorber technology and the benefit for the drive train efficiency. Centrifugal pendulum absorbers are used in the following applications:

- BMW 320D
- Mercedes E250 Diesel
- Chevrolet Colorado Diesel
- GM Products Equipped with the 2.7L L3B Engine
- Chevrolet Corvette (C8)
- ZF 8HP transmission
