= Mercedes-Benz OM639 engine =

Mercedes-Benz OM639
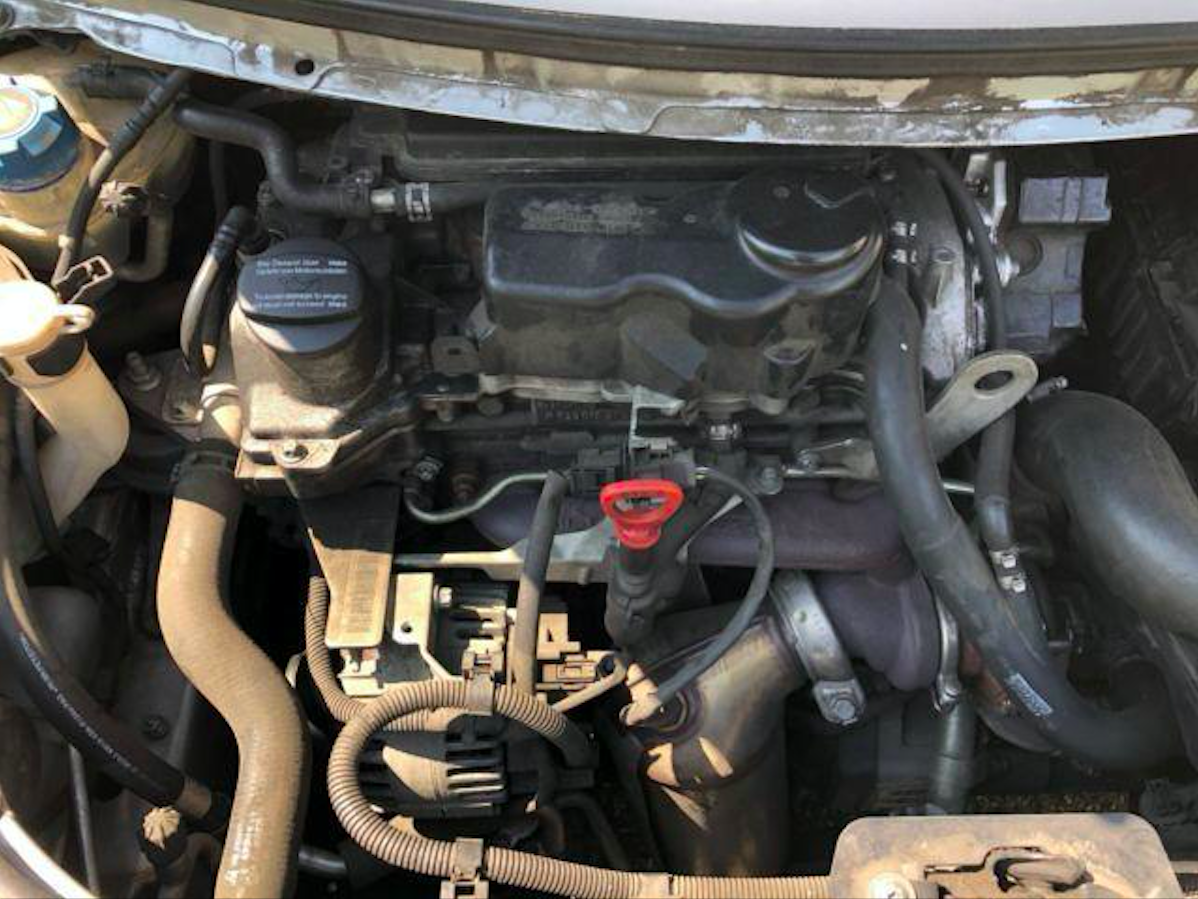

Overview
- Manufacturer: Mercedes-Benz
- Production: 2004–2009

Layout
- Configuration: Straight-three engine
- Displacement: 1.5 L (1,493 cc)
- Cylinder bore: 83 mm (3.27 in)
- Piston stroke: 92 mm (3.62 in)
- Cylinder block material: Aluminium alloy
- Cylinder head material: Aluminium alloy
- Valvetrain: DOHC
- Compression ratio: 18.0:1

Combustion
- Turbocharger: Single-turbo
- Fuel system: Direct injection Common rail
- Fuel type: Diesel
- Cooling system: Water cooled

Output
- Power output: 50–70 kW (68–95 PS; 67–94 hp)
- Torque output: 160–210 N⋅m (118–155 lb⋅ft)

The OM639 is a turbocharged inline-three diesel engine produced by Mercedes-Benz, in collaboration with Mitsubishi Motors.

== Design ==
The OM639 is based on the four-cylinder OM640 engine and features a dual mass flywheel, exhaust gas recirculation, and Euro 4 emission standard compliance. It is transversely mounted behind the front axle and inclined 60 degrees due to the sandwich floor design used in the Smart and Mitsubishi models, so the engine slides underneath the floorpan instead of into the cabin in the event of a head-on collision to improve safety.

== Models ==
Engine	Power	Torque	Years
OM639; DE15 LA R	50 kW (68 PS; 67 hp) @ 4,000 rpm	160 N⋅m (118 lb⋅ft) @ 1,600 rpm	2004–2009
OM639; DE15 LA	70 kW (95 PS; 94 hp) @ 4,000 rpm	210 N⋅m (155 lb⋅ft) @ 1,800 rpm	2004–2009

=== OM639 DE15 LA R ===
- 2004–2006 Smart Forfour 1.5l CDI
- 2004–2009 Mitsubishi Colt 1.5 DI-D

=== OM639 DE15 LA ===
- 2004–2006 Smart Forfour 1.5l CDI
- 2004–2009 Mitsubishi Colt 1.5 DI-D

== Reception ==
Due to the relatively low sales of the cars the engine was placed in to (compared to the class leaders), the engine is in a niche between owners.

At the time, the 70 kW version was the world's most powerful three-cylinder passenger car diesel engine. Despite this, it was only used in the Smart Forfour (until discontinuation) and the Mitsubishi Colt (until its facelift in 2008, citing lack of demand). Today, the most powerful three-cylinder passenger car diesel engine is the BMW B37, which achieves 116 hp.

The engine is reliable, with no common issues or widespread issues noted by owners, and no recalls issued.

Lastly, real world MPG is very close to Mitsubishi's numbers out on the road, with it getting over 90% of its rated official MPG of 58.9 rated by owners of the vehicles.
