= Noise and vibration on maritime vessels =

Problem in naval architecture

On maritime vessels, noise and vibration are not the same but they have the same origin and come in many forms. The methods to handle the related problems are similar, to a certain level, where most shipboard noise problems are reduced by controlling vibration.

== Sources ==
The main producers of mechanically created noise and vibration are the engines, but there are also other sources, like the air conditioning, shaft-line, cargo handling and control equipment and mooring machinery.

=== Diesel engines ===
When looking at diesel driven vessels, the engines induce large accelerations that travel from the foundation of the engine throughout the ship. In most compartments, this type of vibration normally manifests itself as audible noise. The problem with diesels is that, for a given size, there is a fixed amount of power generated per cylinder. To increase power it is necessary to add cylinders but, when cylinders are added, the crankshaft has to be lengthened and after a very limited number of additions, the lengthened crankshaft begins to flex and vibrate all on its own. This results in an increase of vibrations spread all over the ships structure. Crankshaft vibration can be reduced by a harmonic balancer.

=== Electrical engines ===
Large vessels sometimes use electrical propulsion motors, the electrical power being provided by a diesel generator. Noise and vibration of electric motors include, besides mechanical and aerodynamic sources, an electromagnetic source due to electromagnetic forces which is responsible for the "whining noise" of the motor.

=== Turbines ===
Steam turbines and gas turbines, on the other hand, when new and/or in good repair, do not, by themselves generate excessive vibration as long as the turbine blades are in a perfect condition and rotate in a smooth gas flow. But after some time microscopic defects appear and cause small pits to appear in the surface of the intake and the blades which set up eddies in the gas flow, resulting in loss of performance and vibrations. Vibration levels may change with different loading conditions or when doing a manoeuvre.

=== Other sources ===
Besides mechanical produced vibrations, other sources are caused by the motion of the sea, slamming of the vessel on the waves and water depth to mention just a few. The main problem here is that they are less controllable.

The engine-gearbox interaction is usually a source for noise and vibrations. Here, it can be installed highly flexible couplings between the engine and the gearbox. These types of couplings are used because of their low torsional stiffness.

== Exposure limits ==
Exposure to noise and vibrations is regulated and limits for maritime vessels are given in the ISO standard 6954: Guidelines for permissible mechanical vibrations on board seagoing vessels to protect personnel and crew.

Because there are different noise regulations from country to country, the International Maritime Organization (gago) sets some standards for vessels. The table below gives some comparisons of preferred maximum noise levels on board of vessels and onshore levels.

Area	Noise limit land (dB)	IMO noise limit (dB)
workshop	70	85
kitchen	60	75
control rooms	55	75
offices	55	65
dining rooms	55	65
sleeping area	45	60

== Noise and vibration control ==
Noise generated on board ships and submarines can have far-reaching effects on the ability of the vessel to operate safely and efficiently. Military vessels in particular need to be quiet to avoid detection by sonar, so many methods have been used to limit a vessel's noise signature. Controlling noise is therefore a defense measure, most acutely for submarines.

=== Prevention ===
At the design table, the naval architect makes the necessary choices concerning the ship's structure to achieve an optimized design towards noise and vibration control. Decisions are made about the engine and shaft, what kind of instruments and material can be used to reduce noise and vibrations throughout the vessel and what is the best way to implement these. Advanced computer technology tries to simulate these vibrations under different ship conditions to provide an overview of weak spots. The generated vibrations are also compared with the natural frequencies of the different parts/sections and adaptions can be done to the structure. On board, noise travels through the structure (mainly low frequencies), more than through the air, so insulating the engine room is not enough as a way to avoid the noise travelling through the boat.

=== Control at source ===
To control the mechanical vibrations at the origin, isolating fittings, elastic mounting of engines, elastic holding of pipes or dampers can be installed. These will absorb a part of the vibrations (and the noise) produced by the machines. To control the electromagnetic vibrations at the origin, skewing the electric motor or choosing a better slot/pole combination will reduce electromagnetic force harmonics or avoid resonances between magnetic forces and structural modes of the electric motor.

In megayachts, the engines and alternators let out unwanted noise and vibrations. To solve this, the solution is a double elastic suspension where the engine and alternator are mounted with vibration dampers on a common frame. Then, this is mounted elastically between the common frame and the hull. While in megayatchs the requirement is the comfort of crew and passengers, in other applications, such as navy ships, the requirements involve that the engines or generators should work under certain shock loads. To achieve this the ships install double elastic suspensions and high deflection mounts are installed between the unit and base frame. Beforehand, the engineers calculate the torsional vibrations or the 6/12 degree of freedom to guarantee the optimum combination of couplings and mounts.

=== Maintenance ===
Regular maintenance will have a major influence on the performance of instruments and machines. Lubrication of the joints, tightening of the bolts, good alignment of stern contour of the vessel, adjusting of variables following the weekly and monthly schedule are the most effective routes to noise and vibration control.
