= Mercedes-Benz M281 engine =

Mercedes-Benz M281
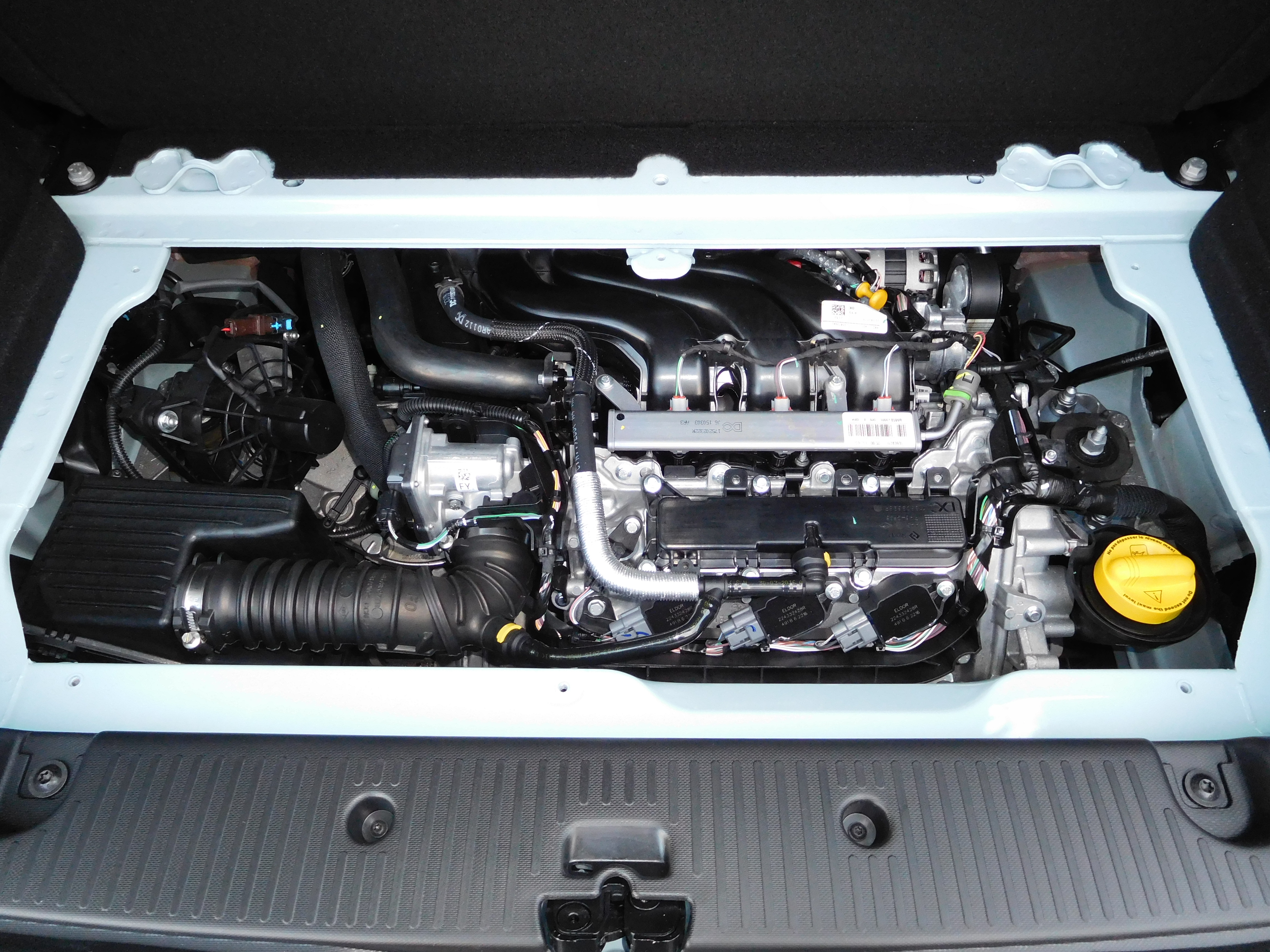

Overview
- Manufacturer: Mercedes-Benz
- Also called: Renault H4D; Renault H4B; Nissan BR
- Production: 2014–

Layout
- Configuration: Straight-three engine
- Displacement: 1.0 L (999 cc); 0.9 L (898 cc) (M281 E09 LA)
- Cylinder bore: 72.2 mm
- Piston stroke: 81.3 mm; 73.1 mm (M281 E09 LA)
- Cylinder block material: Aluminium alloy
- Cylinder head material: Aluminium alloy
- Valvetrain: DOHC
- Compression ratio: 10.5:1; 9.5:1 (M281 E09 LA)

Combustion
- Turbocharger: Single-turbo (M281 E09 LA)
- Fuel system: Multi-point injection
- Fuel type: Petrol
- Oil system: Dry sump. Motor oil provided by Petronas

The M281 is a straight-three petrol engine produced by Mercedes-Benz since 2014.

== Design ==
The M281 uses an aluminium alloy cylinder block and head, and features a dual overhead camshaft with 4 valves per cylinder. It is transversely mounted and is available in three configurations: naturally aspirated with 45 kW (60 hp) or 53 kW (71 hp), or as a turbocharged 66 kW (89 hp) version. These engines are used in Smart, Renault, Nissan, and Dacia models due to Daimler A.G.'s involvement in the Renault–Nissan–Mitsubishi Alliance since 2010.

== Models ==
Engine	Displacement	Power	Torque	Years
M281 E10 R	999 cc (61 cu in)	45 kW (60 hp) at 6,000 rpm	87 N⋅m (64 lb⋅ft) at 3,500 rpm	2014–
M281 E10	999 cc (61 cu in)	52 kW (70 hp) at 6,000 rpm	91 N⋅m (67 lb⋅ft) at 2,850 rpm	2014–
M281 E09 LA turbocharged	898 cc (55 cu in)	66 kW (89 hp) at 5,500 rpm	135 N⋅m (100 lb⋅ft) at 2,500 rpm	2014–
M281 E09 LA turbocharged	898 cc (55 cu in)	80 kW (107 hp) at 5,750 rpm	170 N⋅m (125 lb⋅ft) at 2,000 rpm	2016–2018|
M281 E09 LA turbocharged	898 cc (55 cu in)	92 kW (123 hp) at 5,550 rpm	200 N⋅m (148 lb⋅ft) at 2,000 rpm	2016–2018|

=== M281 E10 R ===
- 2014–2019 C453/A453 Smart Fortwo
- 2014–2019 W453 Smart Forfour

=== M281 E10 (Nissan HR10DE/Renault H4D) ===
- 2014–2019 C453/A453 Smart Fortwo
- 2014–2019 W453 Smart Forfour
- 2014–present Renault Twingo III
- 2017–2020 Dacia Sandero II 1.0 SCe
- 2017–2020 Dacia Logan II 1.0 SCe
- 2017–2022 K14 Nissan Micra 1.0

=== M281 E09 LA (Nissan HR09DET/Renault H4Bt) ===
- 2014–2019 C453/A453 Smart Fortwo
- 2014–2019 W453 Smart Forfour
- 2014–present Renault Twingo III
- 2014–2020 Dacia Sandero II 0.9 TCe
- 2014–2020 Dacia Logan II 0.9 TCe
- 2017–2022 K14 Nissan Micra 1.0
- 2014-2019 Renault Clio IV 0.9
