= Arc spring =

Helical spring which is pre-curved in an arc shape

The arc spring (also known as - bow spring, curved spring, circular spring or "banana" spring) is a special form of coil spring which was originally developed for use in the dual-mass flywheel of internal combustion engine drive trains. The term "arc spring" is used to describe pre-curved or arc-shaped helical compression springs. They have an arc-shaped coil axis.

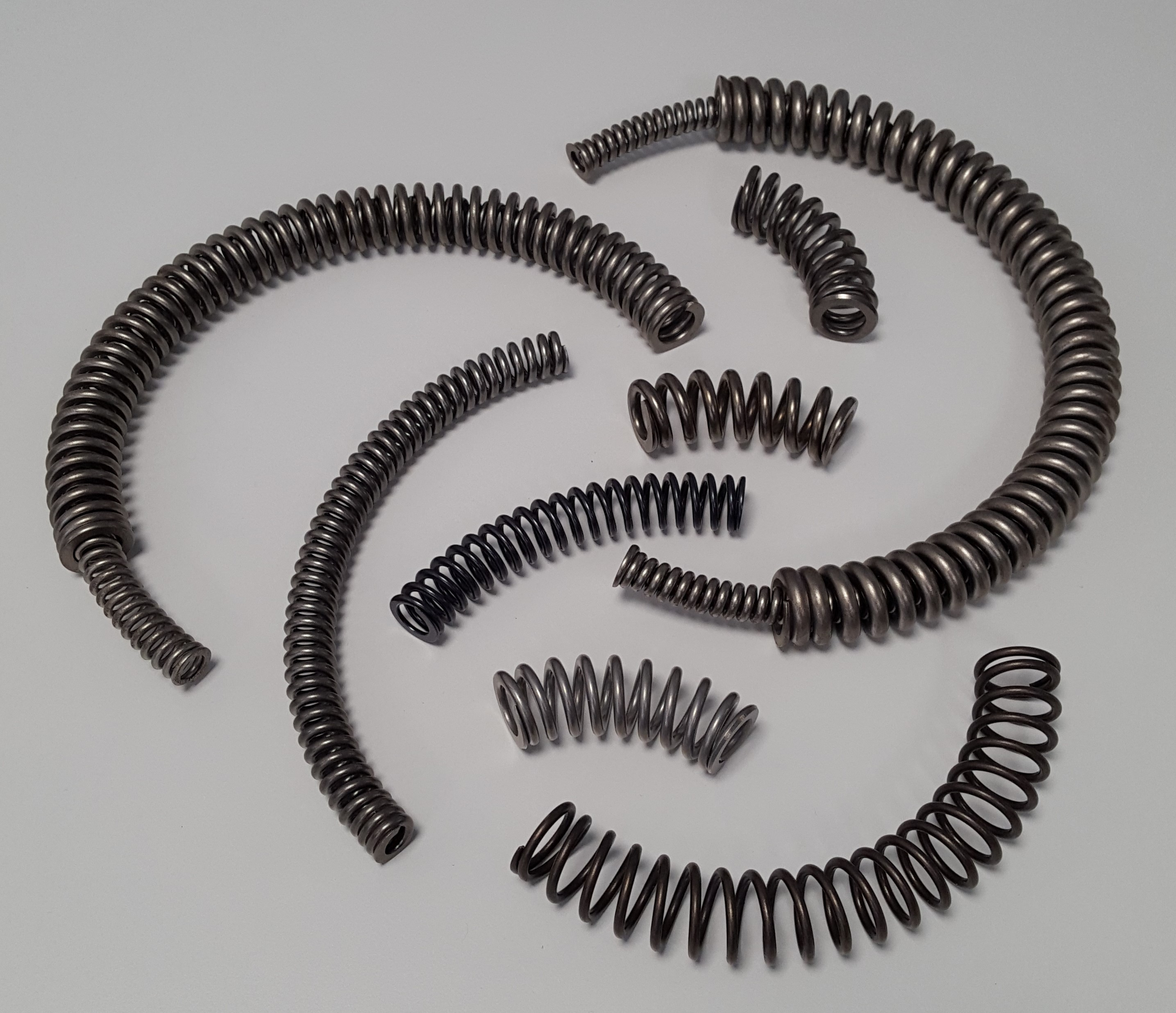
Illustration of various arc springs and arc spring systems (systems consisting of inner and outer arc springs).

== Function ==
Like other technical springs, arc springs are based on the fundamental principle of storing mechanical work in the form of potential energy and the ability to release this energy again. The force is applied through the ends of the spring. A torque $M=F\cdot r$ can be transmitted around an axis via the force $F$ directed along this helical axis and the lever arm to the system center point $r$. The wire of the arc spring is mainly subjected to torsional stress.

== Support ==
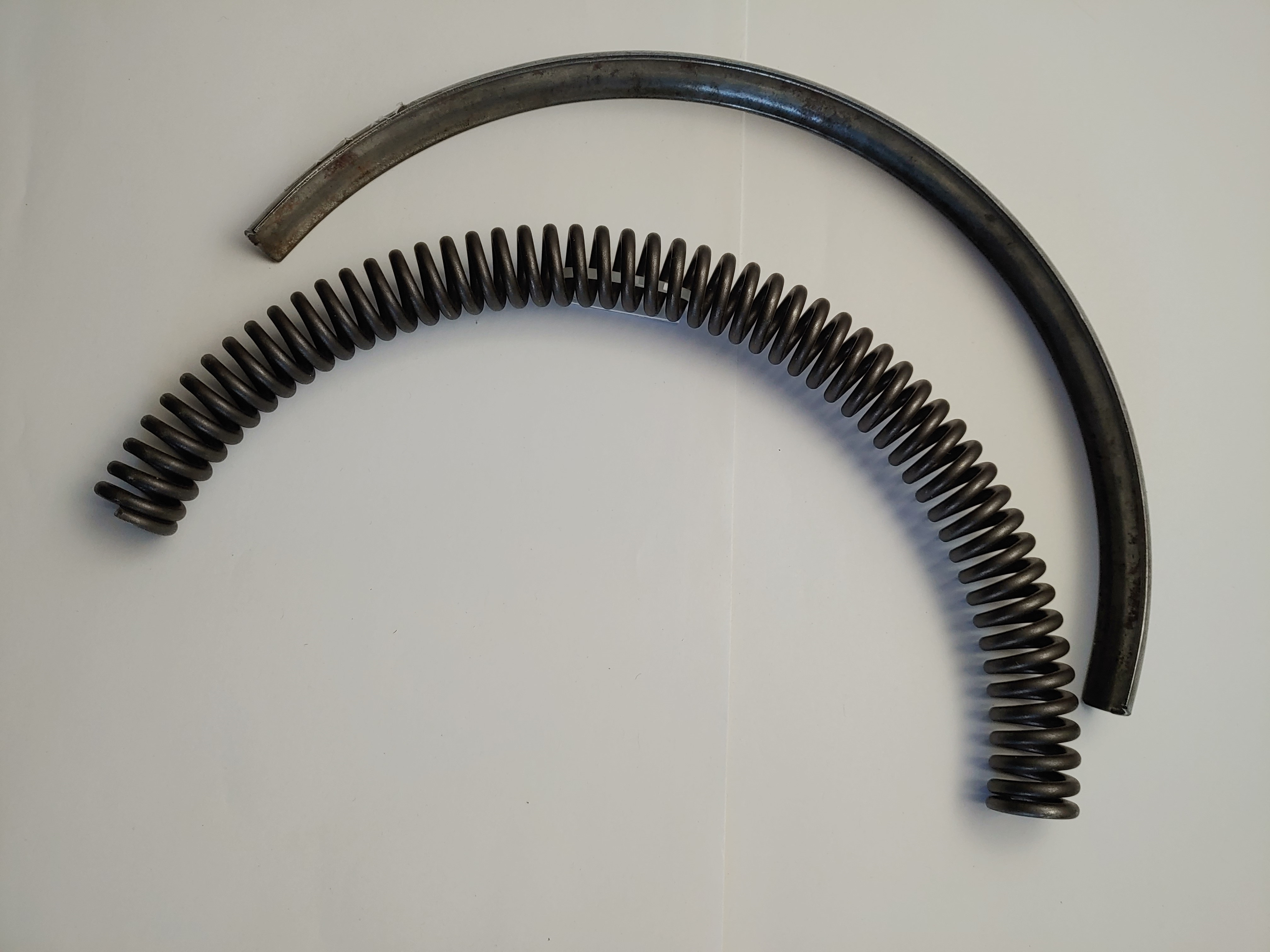
Arc spring with sliding shell.

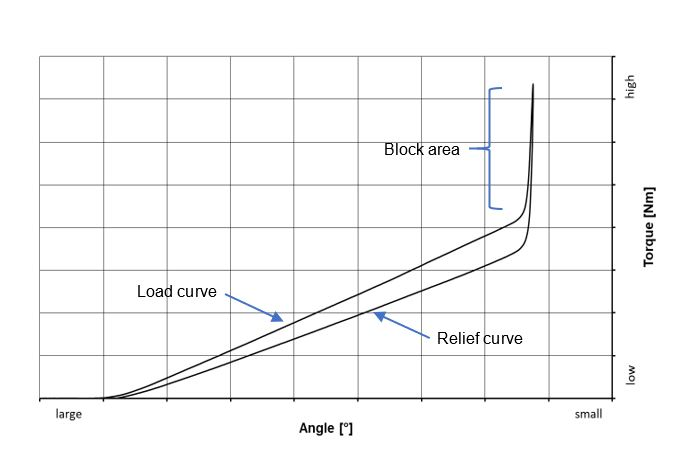
Representation of the friction hysteresis of a single-stage arc spring supported by a sliding shell in a torque-angle characteristic curve.

An arc spring requires suitable support to transmit torque. The support is usually provided from the outside in the form of an arcuate channel (sliding shell) or radially shaped support plates. This prevents buckling of the arc spring. Another result of this support is a hysteresis between the loading and unloading curves in the characteristic curve. This results from the friction of the spring on the radial support and is an intended effect to achieve damping in the system.

== Arc spring systems ==
As with compression springs, spring systems can also be used for arc springs. The main designs are series and parallel connection. With these, single-stage or multi-stage spring characteristics can be achieved. In order to make optimum use of the available space, systems consisting of inner and outer arc springs are often used.

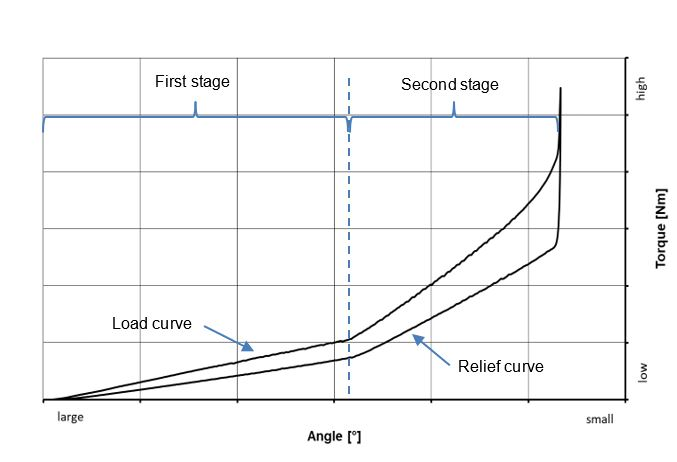
Representation of the friction hysteresis of a two-stage arc spring supported by a sliding shell in a torque-angle characteristic curve.

In addition, the spring characteristic can be influenced by other parameters such as the cross-sectional geometry of the wire, the coil diameter or the number of coils. CAD configurators, which generate a CAD model after entering certain parameters, can contribute to optimal design.

== Applications ==
Schematic representation of bow springs in a dual mass flywheel.

The arc spring is suitable for static and quasi-static as well as dynamic applications. Examples include:

- Dynamic applications:
  - Dual mass flywheel
  - Torque converter
  - Arc spring clutch
  - Belt tensioners, pulley decouplers
- Static and quasi-static applications:
  - Center position return in a robot joint
  - Elastic element in exoskeletons
  - Reset of tailgates or backrests

== Materials and their standardization ==
In principle, the spring steels used for ordinary coil springs can also be used for arc springs. These are:

- DIN EN 10270-1 Patented-drawn unalloyed spring steel wire
- DIN EN 10270-2 Oil tempered spring steel wire
- DIN EN 10270-3 Stainless spring steel wire

== Important parameters ==
Term	Definition
$d$	wire diameter [mm]
$D$	mean coil diameter [mm]
$D$_{e}	outer coil diameter [mm]
$r$	spring active radius [°]
$\alpha$_{0}	free angle [°]
$\alpha$_{c}	solid angle [°]; angle of the arc-spring at which the coils have contact
$n$	active coils
$n$_{t}	total coils
$R$	spring rate [Nmm/°]
