= Smart Forfour =

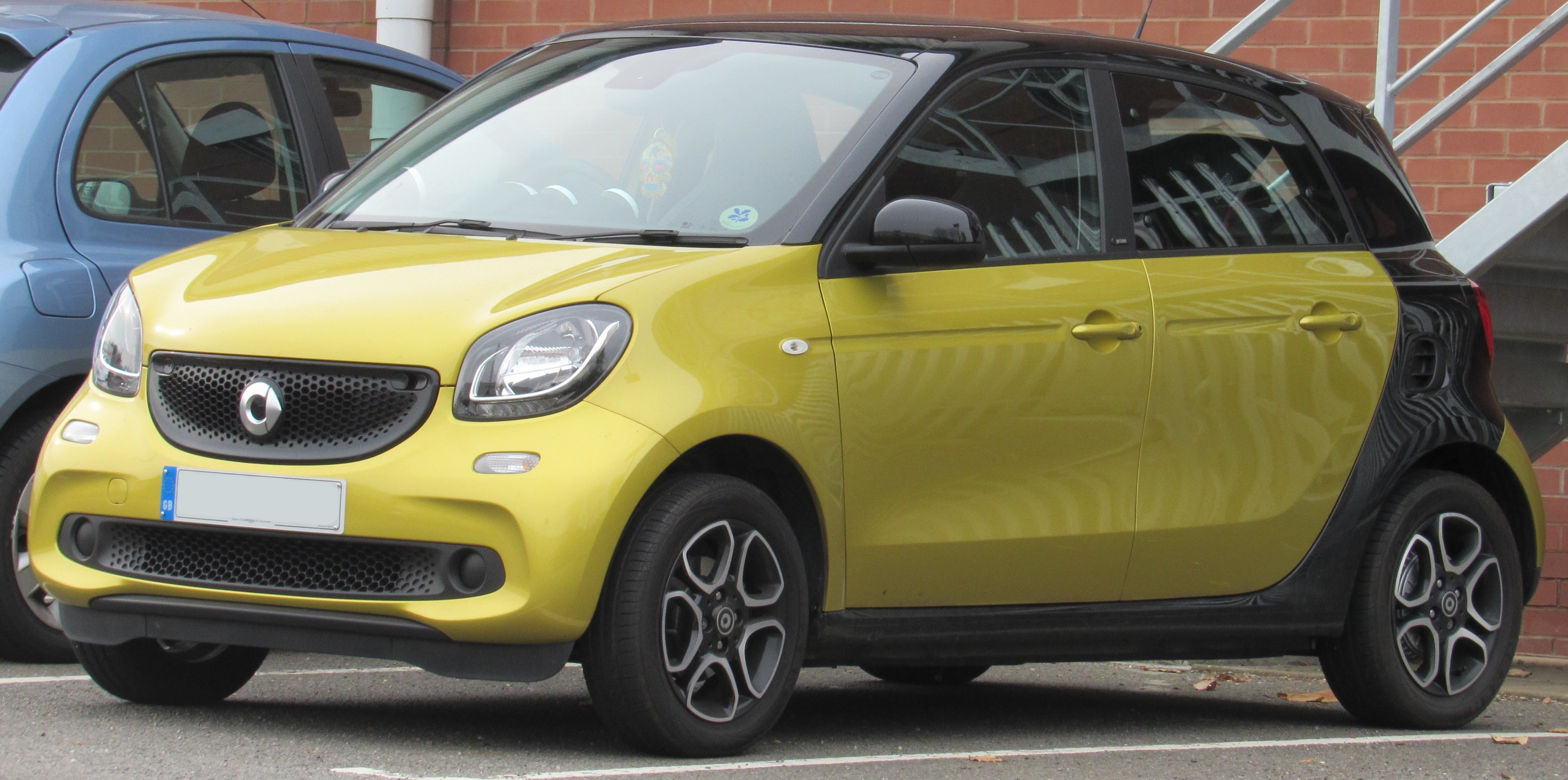
- Second generation Smart Forfour

Overview
- Manufacturer: DaimlerChrysler (2004–2006); Daimler AG (2014–2021)
- Production: 2003–2006; 2014–2021

Body and chassis
- Class: Supermini (B) (2003–2006); City car (A) (2014–2021)
- Body style: 5-door hatchback

Chronology
- Successor: Smart #1 (EQ Forfour)

The Smart Forfour (stylized as "smart forfour") is a city car (A-segment) marketed by Smart over two generations. The first generation was marketed in Europe from 2003 to 2006 with a front-engine configuration, sharing its platform with the Mitsubishi Colt. The second generation was marketed in Europe from 2014 after an eight-year hiatus, using rear-engine or rear electric motor configurations. It is based on the third-generation Renault Twingo, which also forms a basis for the third-generation Smart Fortwo. A battery electric version was marketed as the EQ Forfour beginning in 2018.

The petrol-powered Forfour was discontinued in 2019 as production of all Smart internal combustion models ended at that time. Production of the EQ Forfour ended in 2021. It was indirectly replaced by the larger Smart #1 crossover.

== First generation (W454; 2004) ==
First generation (W454)
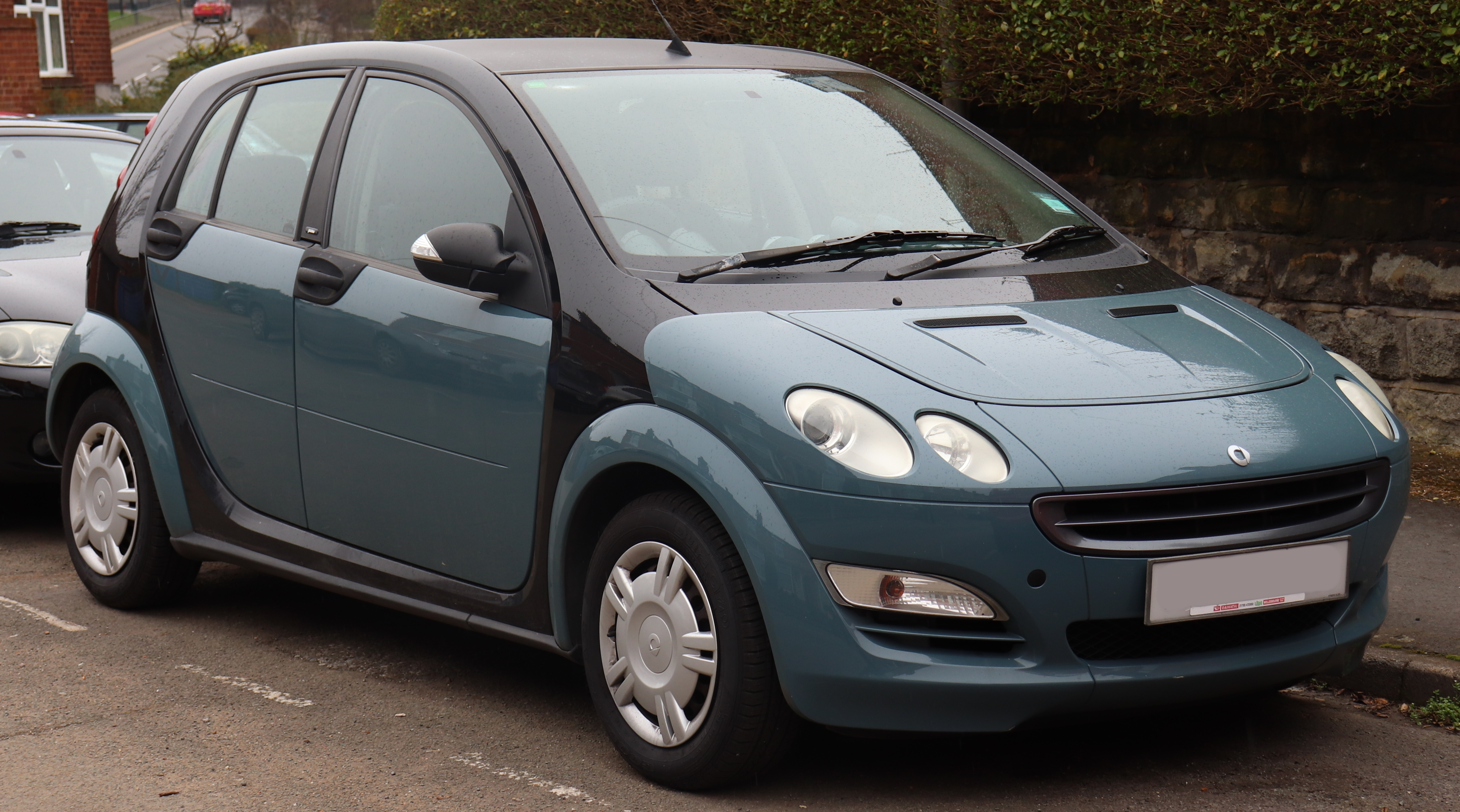

Overview
- Production: 2003–2006
- Assembly: Netherlands: Born (NedCar)

Body and chassis
- Class: Supermini (B)
- Body style: 5-door hatchback
- Layout: Front-engine, front-wheel-drive
- Related: Mitsubishi Colt; Senova D20; Senova X25; Changhe Q25

Powertrain
- Engine: petrol: 1124 cc M134 E11 I3; 1332 cc M135 E13 I4; 1468 cc M122 E15 AL turbo I4; 1499 cc M135 E15 I4; diesel: 1493 cc OM639 DE15 cdi I3
- Transmission: 5-speed Getrag 452 manual 6-speed Getrag 452 AMT automated manual (Softouch)

Dimensions
- Wheelbase: 2,500 mm (98.4 in)
- Length: 3,752 mm (147.7 in)
- Width: 1,684 mm (66.3 in)
- Height: 1,450 mm (57.1 in)

=== Production ===
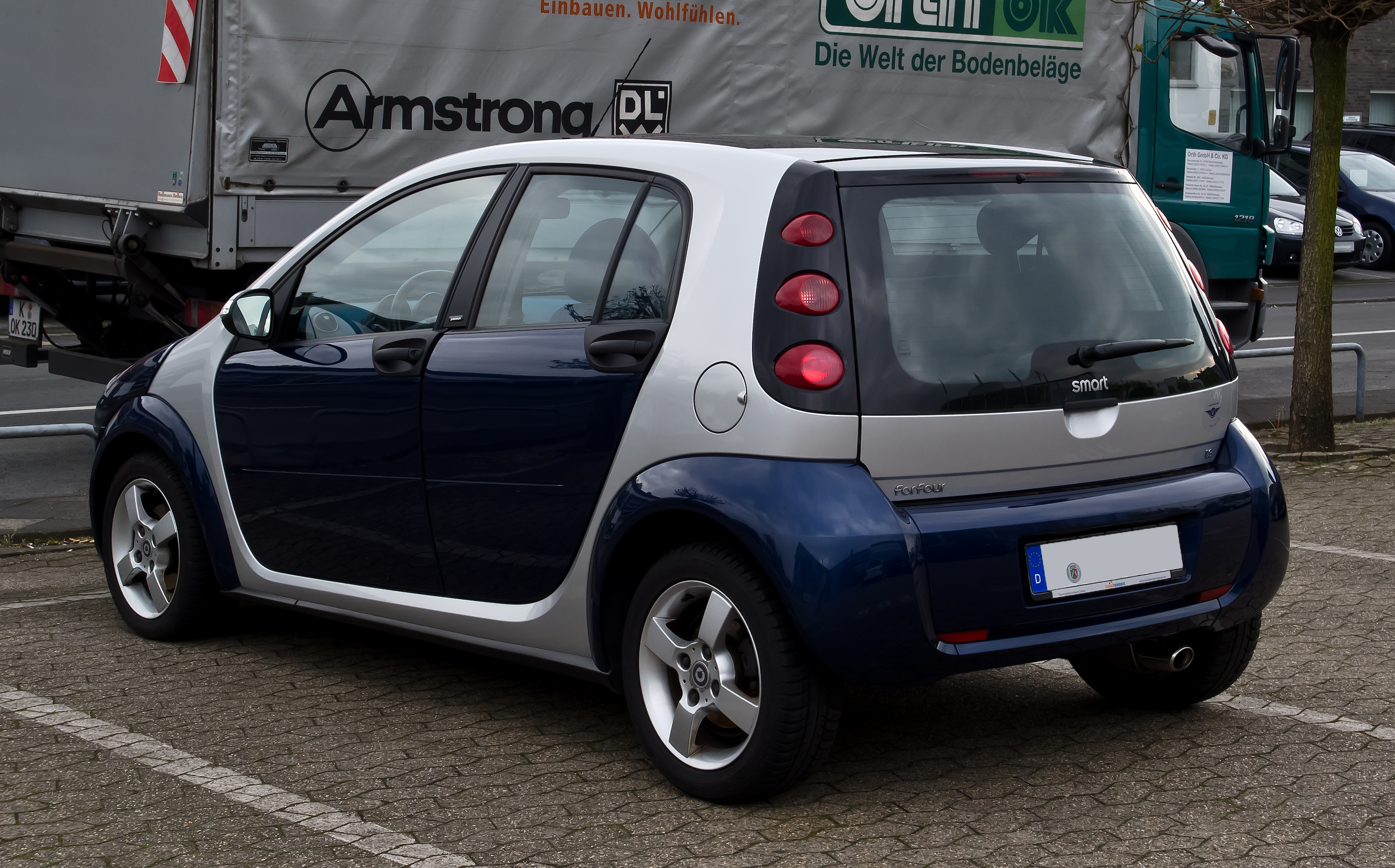
Rear view

The car was produced at the NedCar factory in the Netherlands in conjunction with Mitsubishi Motors. This is the same factory that produced Volvo 300s in the 1970s and 1980s and the Volvo S40 in the 1990s. To save production costs, the Smart Forfour shared almost all of its components with the 2003 Mitsubishi Colt. This includes the chassis, suspension and a new generation of MIVEC petrol engines, ranging from the three-cylinder 1.1 L (1,124 cc) to the four-cylinder with power up to 80 kW (109 PS; 107 hp).

The Smart Forfour was phased out from production in 2006 due to slow sales.

=== Equipment ===
Depending on the version, it came equipped with ESP, ABS (standard on all models), 14-inch or 15-inch alloy wheels or, optional, 16-inch ones (17-inch on the Brabus model), safety cell, a panoramic sunroof (or, optional, electric sunroof), height-adjustable driver seat, illuminated glove box, radio/CD-player, fog lights, front and side airbags (standard on all models), alarm, automatic air conditioning, electric front windows, and as options - multifunctional steering wheel, shift paddles, heated front seats, lounge seats, navigation and color display with telephone keypad or DVD navigation with a larger display, CD changer, window bags, rain sensor, automatic lights on the system (in poor visibility), leather package.

=== Marketing ===
The sales brochures state that the interior "is designed around the concept of a lounge"; to test this, Top Gear presenters, James May and Richard Hammond spent 24 hours inside the Forfour. They said they would not buy the car due to its high price and poor driving dynamics compared to its rivals.

Following Smart's initial success for the fortwo in the U.S., and due to surprisingly high popularity in the Forfour, former Mercedes-Benz exec Rainer Schmückle revealed that officials were considering relaunching the car.

=== Forfour Brabus (2005) ===
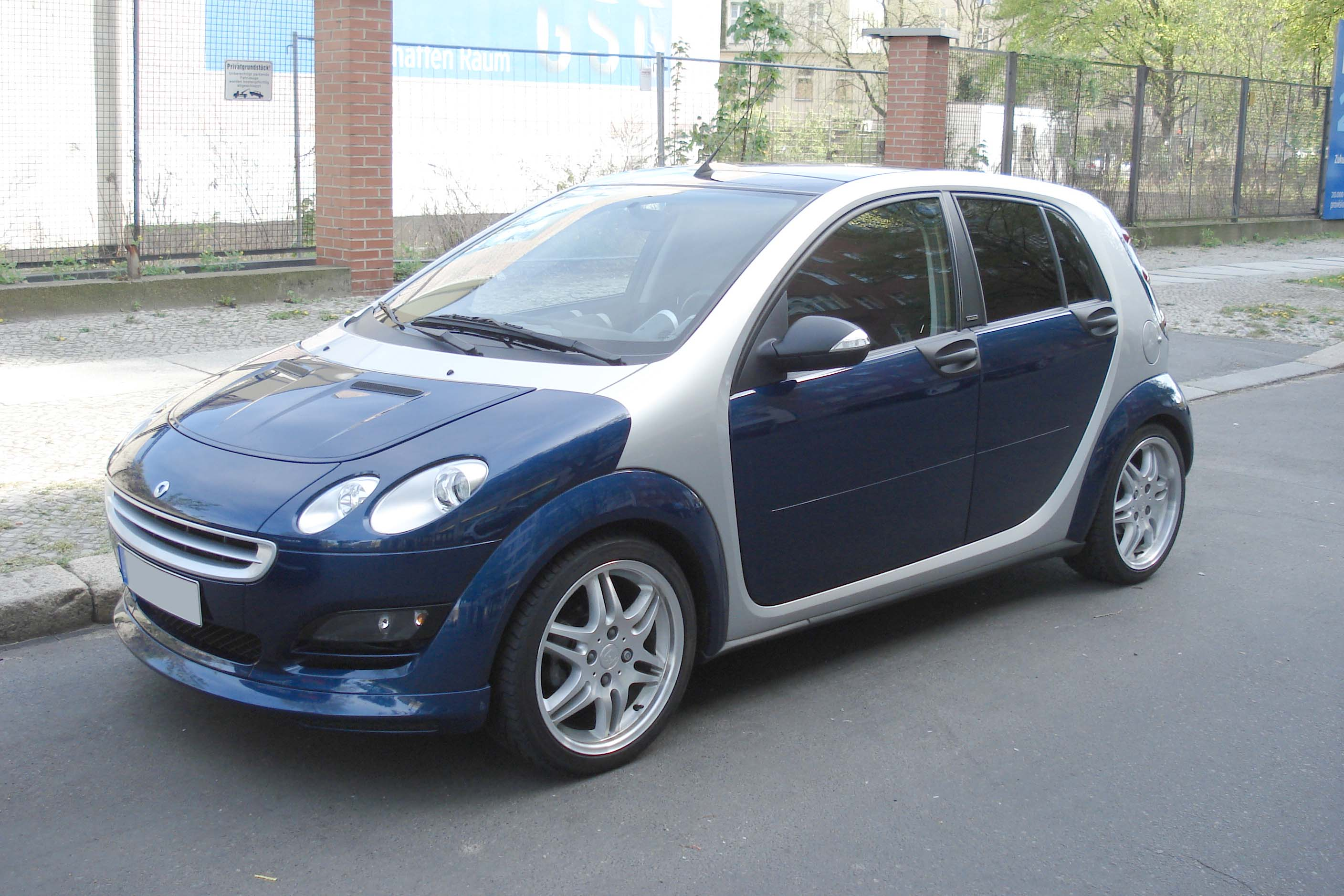
Smart Forfour Brabus

Forfour Brabus is a version of Smart Forfour tuned by Brabus with a turbocharged Mitsubishi 4G15 engine rated 130 kW (177 PS; 174 hp), 27 PS (20 kW; 27 hp) more than the Mitsubishi Colt CZT. It can reach a maximum speed of 221 km/h (137 mph) and accelerate from zero to 100 km/h (62 mph) in 6.9 seconds.

=== Engines ===
Engine	Code	Type	Displacement	Power	Torque	Top speed	0–100 km/h (0-62 mph)	Combined consumption	CO_{2} emissions	Production years
Petrol engines
1.0 12v	M134 E11 red.	I3	1,124 cc	47 kW (64 PS; 63 hp) at 5500 rpm	92 N⋅m (68 lb⋅ft) at 2500 rpm	158 km/h (98 mph)	15.3 s	6.9 L/100 km (41 mpg_{‑imp})	128 g/km	2005–2006
1.1 12v	M134 E11	I3	1,124 cc	55 kW (75 PS; 74 hp) at 6000 rpm	100 N⋅m (74 lb⋅ft) at 3500 rpm	165 km/h (103 mph)	13.4 s	7.0 L/100 km (40 mpg_{‑imp})	130 g/km	2004–2006
1.3 16v	M135 E13	I4	1,332 cc	70 kW (95 PS; 94 hp) at 5250 rpm	125 N⋅m (92 lb⋅ft) at 4000 rpm	180 km/h (112 mph)	10.8 s	7.4 L/100 km (38 mpg_{‑imp})	138 g/km	2004–2006
1.5 16v	M135 E15	I4	1,499 cc	80 kW (109 PS; 107 hp) at 6000 rpm	145 N⋅m (107 lb⋅ft) at 4000 rpm	190 km/h (118 mph)	9.8 s	7.8 L/100 km (36 mpg_{‑imp})	145 g/km	2004–2006
1.5 16v Brabus	M122 E15 AL	I4 turbo	1,468 cc	130 kW (177 PS; 174 hp) at 6000 rpm	230 N⋅m (170 lb⋅ft) at 3500 rpm	221 km/h (137 mph)	6.9 s	6.9 L/100 km (41 mpg_{‑imp})	159 g/km	2005–2006
Diesel engines
1.5 12v cdi 50 kW	OM639 DE15 LA red.	I3	1,493 cc	50 kW (68 PS; 67 hp) at 4000 rpm	160 N⋅m (118 lb⋅ft) at 1800 rpm	160 km/h (99 mph)	13.9 s	5.8 L/100 km (49 mpg_{‑imp})	121 g/km	2004–2006
1.5 12v cdi 70 kW	OM639 DE15 LA	I3	1,493 cc	70 kW (95 PS; 94 hp) at 4000 rpm	210 N⋅m (155 lb⋅ft) at 1800 rpm	180 km/h (112 mph)	10.5 s	5.8 L/100 km (49 mpg_{‑imp})	121 g/km	2004–2006

The 1.5 L (92 in^{3}) common direct injection (cdi) diesel engine, is a three-cylinder Mercedes-Benz engine derived from the four-cylinder used in the Mercedes-Benz A-Class, and is available with either 68 PS (50 kW; 67 hp) or 95 PS (70 kW; 94 hp).

=== Transmissions ===
All models could be equipped with either a 5-speed manual or a 6-speed automatic (Softouch) transmission, except the 1.0-liter version and the Brabus version, which could only use 5-speed manual transmissions.

=== Safety ===
ANCAP test results* Smart Forfour variants with side airbags (2003)
Test	Score
Overall	4 /5 stars
Frontal offset	11.99/16
Side impact	12.84/16
Pole	Not assessed
Seat belt reminders	1/3
Whiplash protection	Not assessed
Pedestrian protection	Poor
Electronic stability control	Standard

== Second generation (W453; 2014) ==
Second generation (W453)
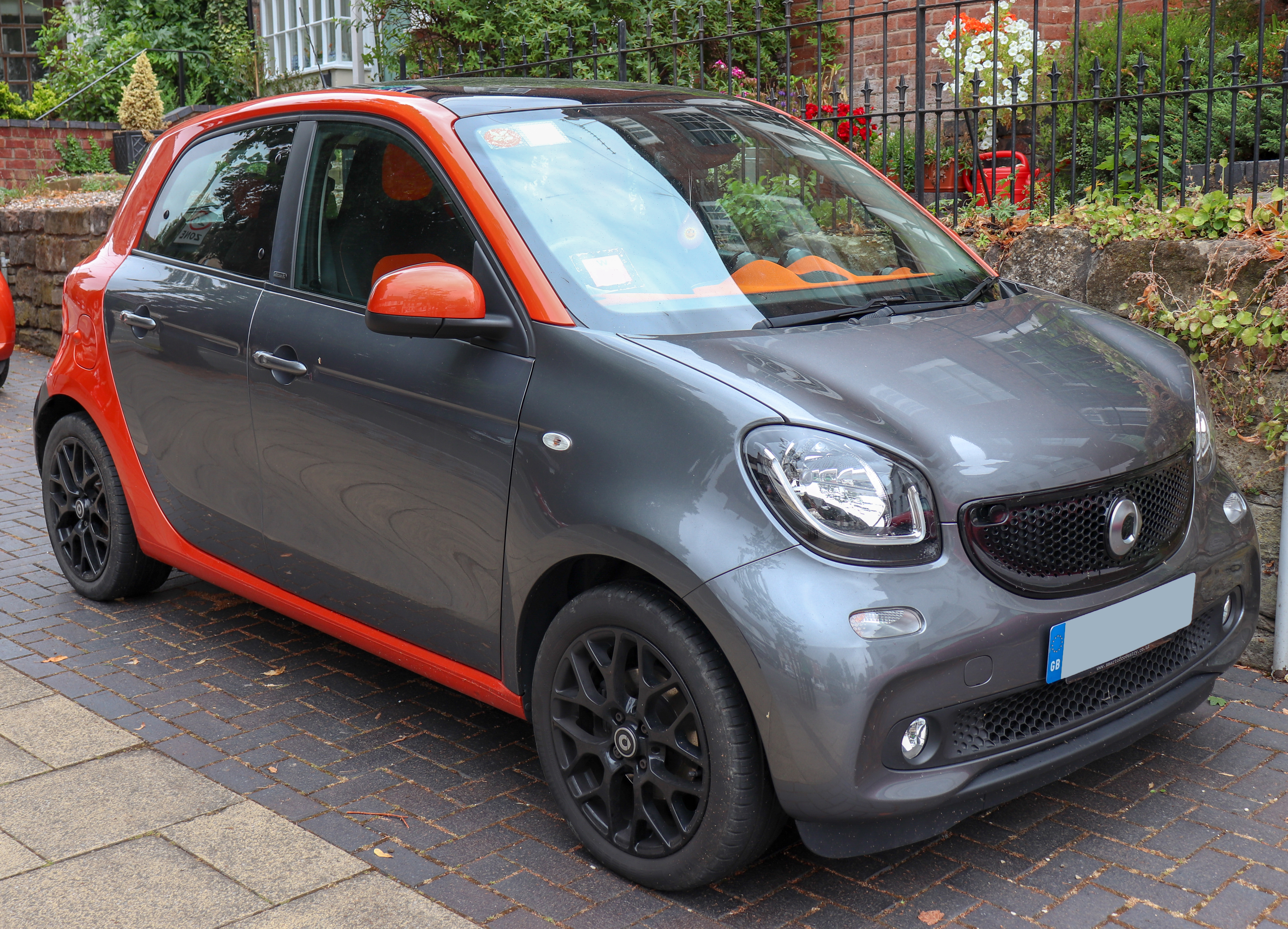

Overview
- Production: 2014–2019 (petrol); 2017–2021 (electric)
- Assembly: France: Hambach; Slovenia: Novo Mesto (Revoz)

Body and chassis
- Class: City car (A)
- Body style: 5-door hatchback
- Layout: Rear-engine, rear-wheel-drive
- Related: Smart Fortwo (C453); Renault Twingo III

Powertrain
- Engine: 0.9 L M281 I3 turbocharged (petrol); 1.0 L M281 I3 (petrol)
- Electric motor: 82 PS synchronous electric motor
- Transmission: 5-speed manual 6-speed dual-clutch

Dimensions
- Wheelbase: 2,490 mm (98.0 in)
- Length: 3,495 mm (137.6 in)
- Width: 1,640 mm (64.6 in)
- Height: 1,550 mm (61.0 in)

The second-generation Forfour was jointly developed with Renault, reportedly sharing approximately 70% of its parts with the third-generation Renault Twingo, while retaining the trademark hemispherical steel safety cell, marketed as the Tridion cell. The Fortwo and the Forfour are both manufactured in Smartville. However, the EQ version of the Forfour was manufactured alongside the Renault Twingo 3 in Novo Mesto, Slovenia. Smartville, where the W450 and W451 build series have been manufactured, underwent a 200 million euro upgrade beginning in mid-2013, in preparation for the C453 Fortwo. The second generation Forfour, along with the new Fortwo went on sale in October, shortly after their debuting at the Paris Motor Show.

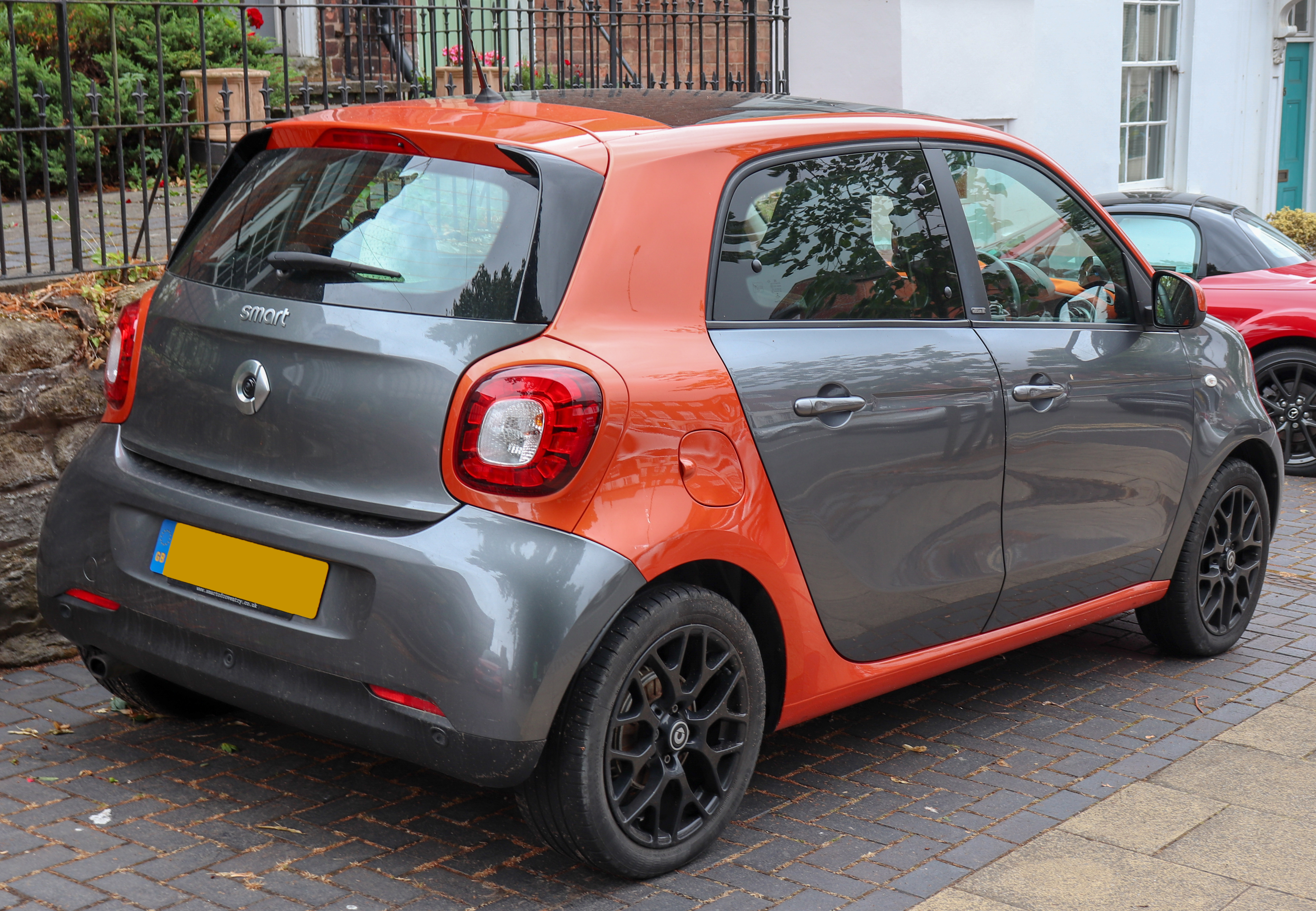
Rear view

The Smart Fortwo and Forfour is offered with a choice of manual transmission or double-clutch automatic — and no longer with the Getrag automated manual. Both models feature a wider track, overall width increased by 10 cm (over the second generation Fortwo), improved ride and improved noise isolation.

For the third generation, Autoweek reported that Daimler consulted with Ford to learn about Ford's 1.0-litre turbocharged inline 3-cylinder engine, in turn sharing information about its own Euro 6 stratified lean-burn gasoline engines.

The launch model "edition #1" was a limited period version, presented in Tempodrom, Berlin. Delivery is scheduled to commence in November 2014 with the Forfour 52 kW and 66 kW models to follow in December 2014, and twinamic dual-clutch transmission models in the spring of 2015.

=== Smart Fourjoy concept (2013) ===
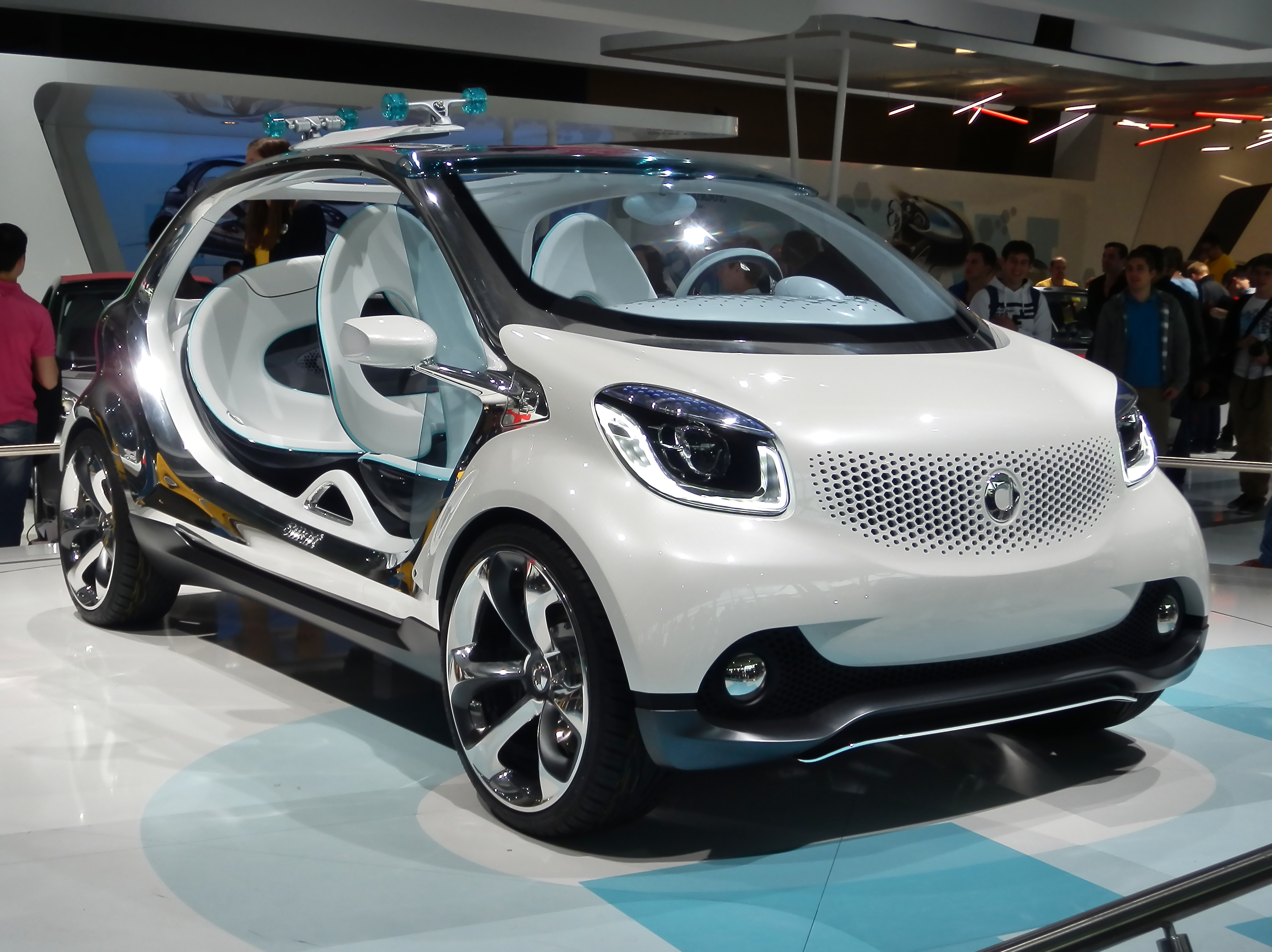
Smart Fourjoy concept

Smart Fourjoy concept includes Smart's signature Tridion cell in polished full-aluminium, tail lights integrated in the Tridion cell, spherical instrument cluster, raised smart lettering milled from aluminium on the side skirts, pearlescent white on the bumpers, front bonnet and tailgate; headlamps without a glass cover, U-shaped daytime running lights, LED front and tail lights, transparent petroleum-coloured moulded wind deflector at the top of the front windscreen, on the A-pillars on the sides and on the rear roof spoiler; rear dark chrome seats, a piping-like line with the same petroleum colour as the plexiglass accents on the exterior, instrument panel with convex surface and touch-sensitive operating functions, spherical instrument cluster, single-spoke steering wheel, two smartphones mounted on the dashboard and on the centre tunnel, 55 kW magneto-electric motor, 17.6kWh lithium-ion battery, 22 kW onboard charger, two electrically driven skateboards on the roof, helmets under the rear seats, a high-definition camera.

The vehicle was unveiled at the 2013 Frankfurt Auto Show (without doors and roof).

=== Concept plug-in hybrid conversion ===
A concept version, never manufactured, of the Smart Forfour was converted as a plug-in hybrid by third-party vendors. The lithium-ion battery can propel the vehicle up to 84 mph (135 km/h) and last on its own for up to 20 miles (32 km) with an engine that combined a 68 hp (51 kW; 69 PS), 1.5 L (92 in^{3}), three-cylinder turbocharged diesel engine and two high-efficiency permanent-magnet electric motors. It received an award from the Energy Saving Trust for the "Ultra Low Carbon Car Challenge" project.

=== Electric version ===
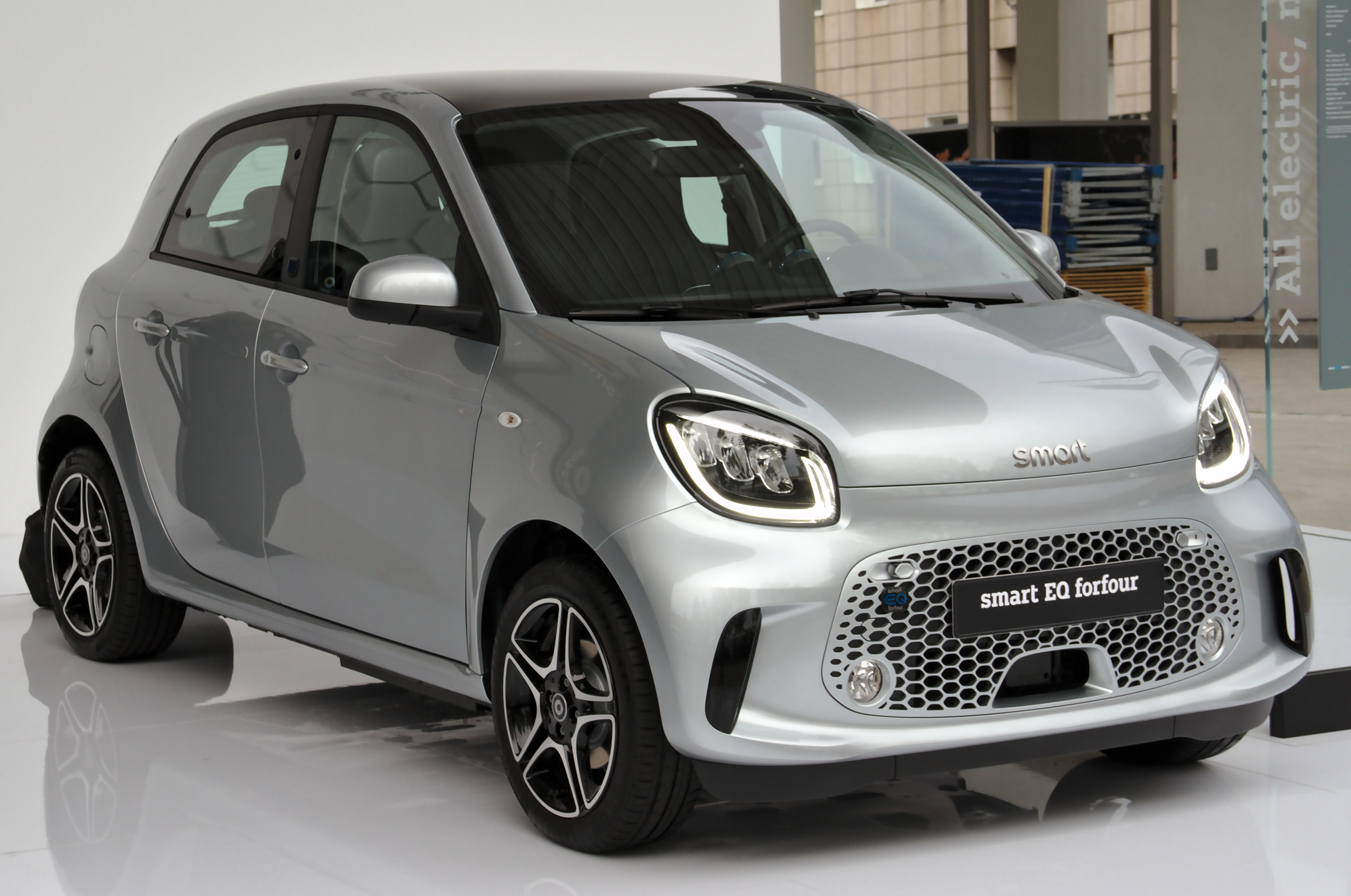
EQ forfour

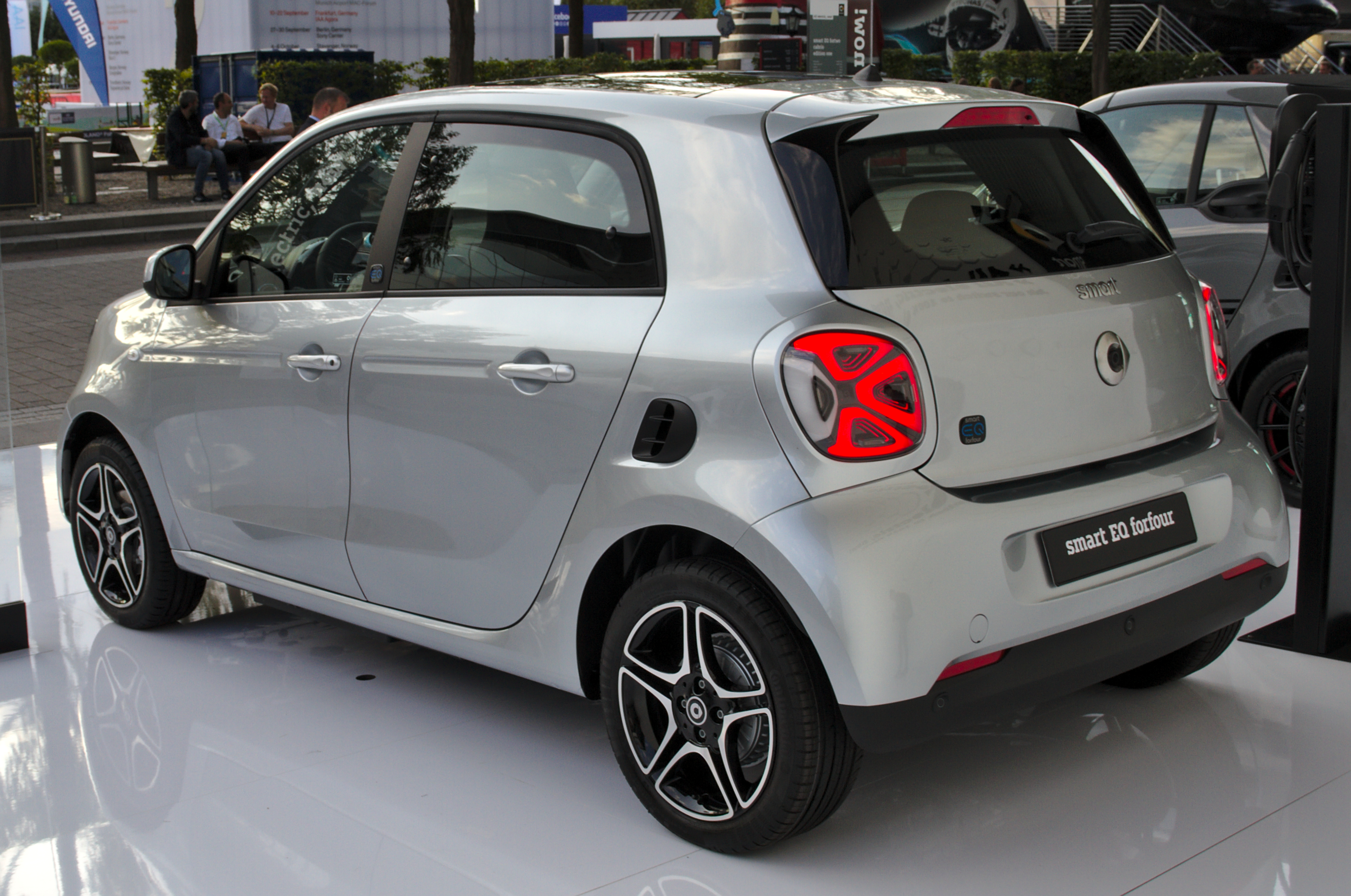
EQ forfour rear view

In 2013, Daimler projected it would produce an electric version of the Smart Forfour during the second generation of production, for launch in 2015. The battery-electric smart forfour electric drive entered mass-production in 2017 at Renault's Novo Mesto plant in Slovenia and was marketed in Europe, competing with other electric city cars such as the MG ZS EV, Renault Twingo Z.E (with which it shares many components), and Volkswagen E-up!, including the SEAT Mii electric and Škoda Citigo-e iV, rebadged versions of the E-up!. In 2019, it was restyled and rebranded to Smart EQ ForFour, after Chinese automobile manufacturer Geely took a stake in Daimler, becoming a 50–50 partner in Smart, and Smart pivoted to market electric cars only. The EQ ForFour was discontinued in early 2022.

It used a rear-mounted 60 kW (80 hp) electric motor with a peak torque of 160 N⋅m (120 lbf⋅ft) and is fitted with a 17.6 kW-hr battery. The EQ Forfour has a rated consumption of 13.1 kWh/100 km (combined) and achieves 160 km (99 mi) range using the NEDC test cycle, dropping to 130 km (81 mi) on the WLTP cycle. As tested, Autocar had a range of 109 km (68 mi), using "a gentle touring driving style", dropping to 80 km (50 mi) when not driving as carefully. The kerb weight of the electric forfour is 1,200 kg (2,600 lb), approximately 225 kg (496 lb) heavier than an equivalent petrol-powered forfour.

=== Powertrain ===
Petrol engines
Model	Years	Type/code	Power, torque@rpm
Forfour 45 kW	2015–2017	999 cc (61.0 cu in) I3	60 PS (44 kW; 59 hp)@?, ?@?
Forfour 52 kW	2014–2019	999 cc (61.0 cu in) I3	71 PS (52 kW; 70 hp)@?, 91 N⋅m (67 lbf⋅ft)@2850
Forfour 66 kW	2014–2019	898 cc (54.8 cu in) I3 turbo	90 PS (66 kW; 89 hp)@?, 135 N⋅m (100 lbf⋅ft)@2500
Forfour Brabus	2016–2018	898 cc (54.8 cu in) I3 turbo	108 PS (79 kW; 107 hp)@?, 175 N⋅m (129 lbf⋅ft)@2500
Electric motor
Model	Years	Type/code	Power, torque@rpm
EQ Forfour	2017–2021	synchronous electric motor	82 PS (60 kW), 160 N⋅m (118 lbf⋅ft)

All petrol models are available with a 5-speed manual or 6-speed twinamic dual-clutch transmission.

== Sales ==
A total of 248,856 second-generation Forfours have been produced, 14.9% of them (32,326 units) being electric models.
