= Dual-mass flywheel =

Device used to smooth and dampen abrupt changes in rotational speed/torque

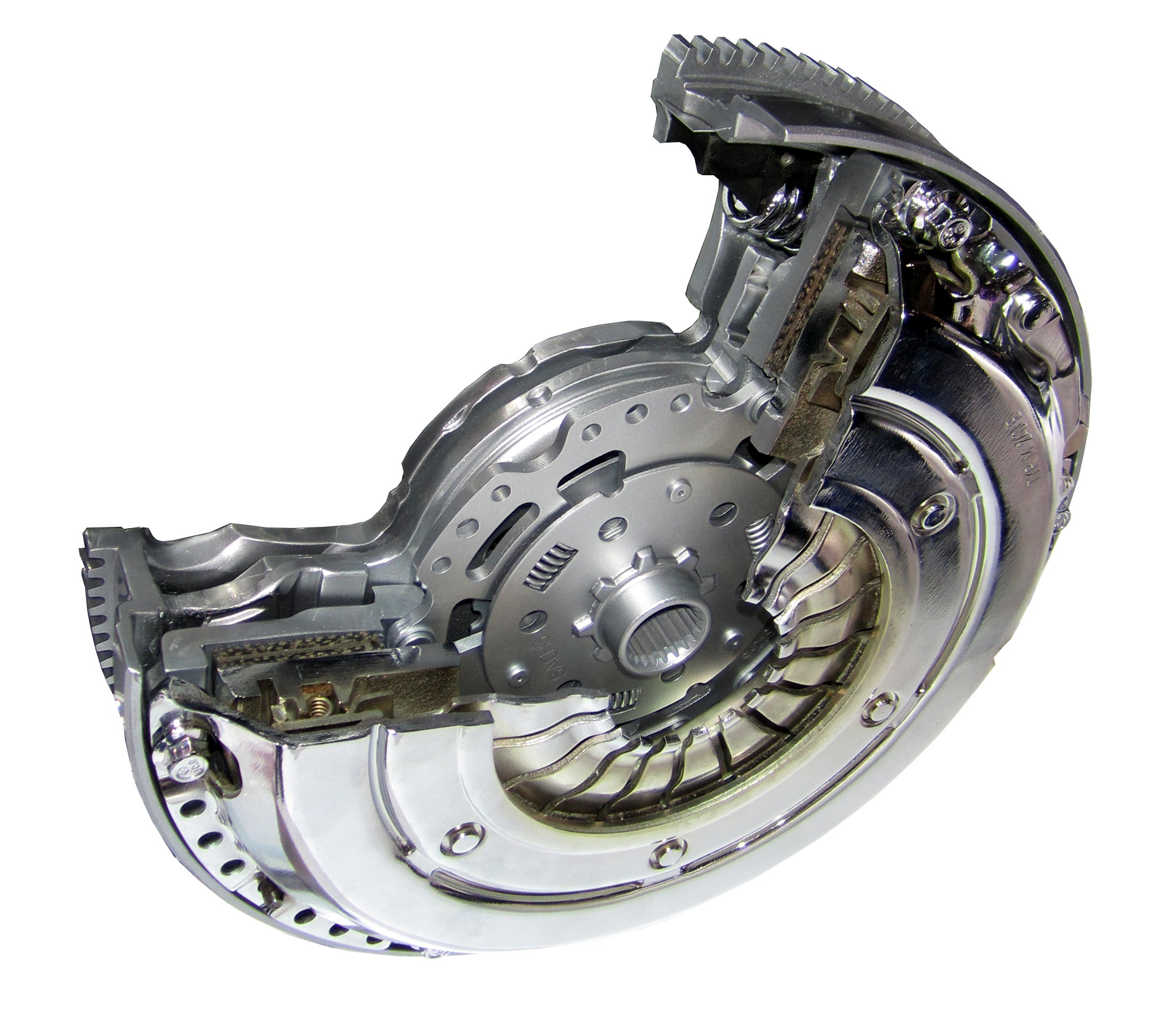
Dual-mass flywheel section

A dual-mass flywheel (DMF or DMFW) is a rotating mechanical device that is used to provide continuous energy (rotational energy) in systems where the energy source is not continuous, the same way as a conventional flywheel acts, but damping any violent variation of torque or revolutions that could cause an unwanted vibration. The vibration reduction is achieved by accumulating stored energy in the two flywheel half masses over a period of time but damped by arc springs, doing that at a rate that is compatible with the energy source, and then releasing that energy at a much higher rate over a relatively short time. A compact dual-mass flywheel often includes the whole clutch, including the pressure plate and the friction disc.

== History ==
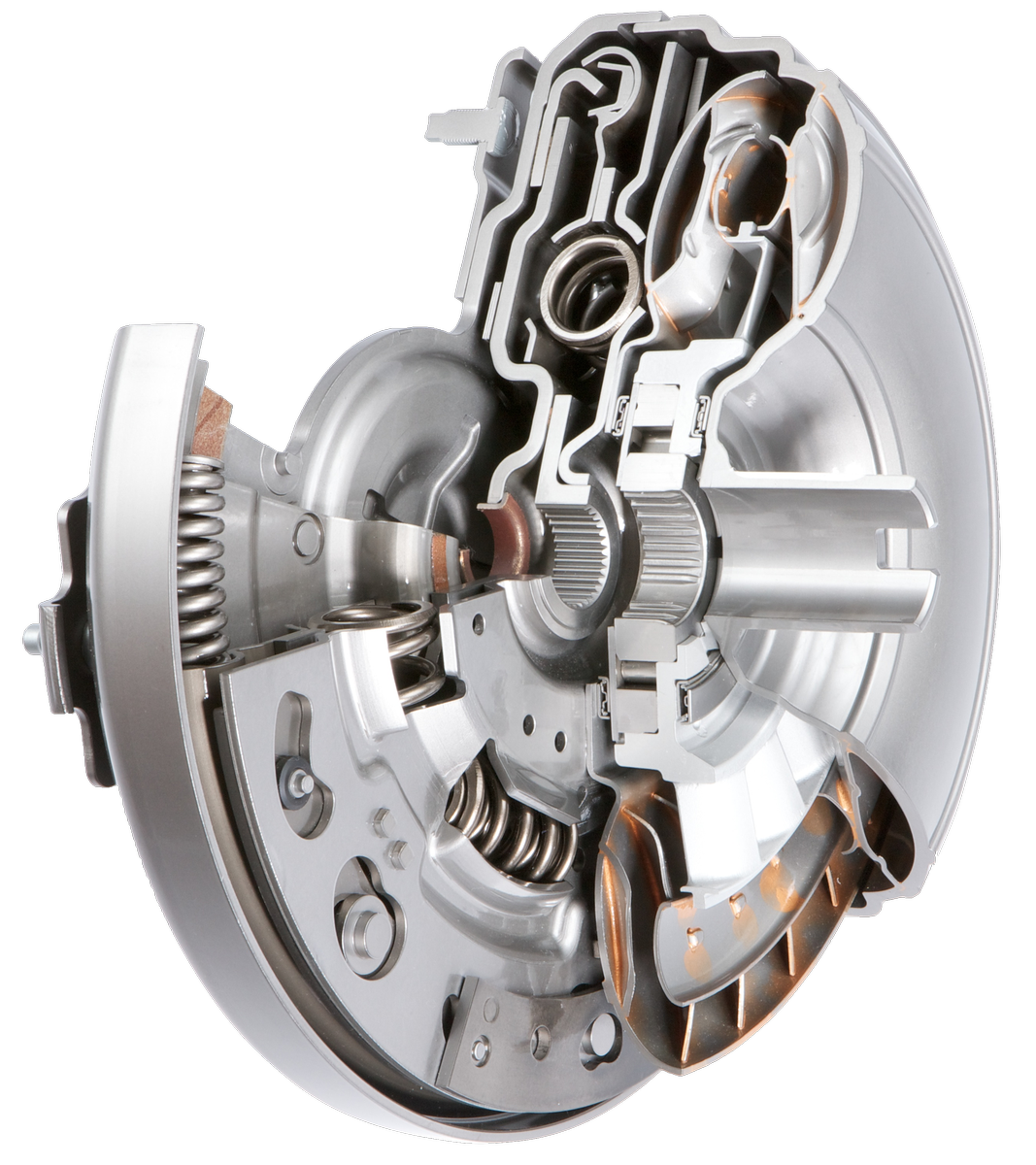
Schaeffler torque converter with a pendulum absorber using the same DMF's bent springs

Dual-mass flywheels were developed to address the escalation of torque and power, especially at low revs. The growing concern for the environment and the adoption of more stringent regulations have marked the development of more efficient new engines, lowering the cylinder number to 3 or even 2 cylinders, and allowing the delivery of more torque and power at low revolutions. The counterpart has been an increase in the level of vibration which traditional clutch discs are unable to absorb. This is where the dual-mass flywheels play a key role, making these mechanical developments more viable.

The absorption capacity of the vibration depends on the moving parts of the DMF, these parts are subject to wear. Whenever the clutch is replaced, the DMF should be checked for wear. The two key wear characteristics are freeplay and sideplay (rock). These should be measured to determine whether the flywheel is serviceable. The wear limit specifications can be found in vehicle or flywheel manufacturer's published documentation. Other failure modes are severely grooved/damaged clutch mating surface, grease loss, and cracking.

== Types ==
Principle of dual-mass flywheel. Black: arc springs. Red: flywheel, crankshaft side Blue: flywheel, transmission side

The main type is called a planetary DMF. The planetary gear and the torsional damper are incorporated into the main flywheel. For this purpose, the main flywheel is divided into primary and secondary pinion-connected masses, and between them there are four different types of bent springs:

=== Individual bent spring ===
The simplest form of the bent spring is the standard single arc spring.

=== One-phase bent springs in parallel ===
The standard arc springs are called parallel springs of one phase. These consist of an outer and an inner arc spring of almost equal lengths and connected in parallel. The individual characteristic curves of the two arc springs are added to form the characteristic curve of the spring pair.

=== Two-phase bent springs in parallel ===
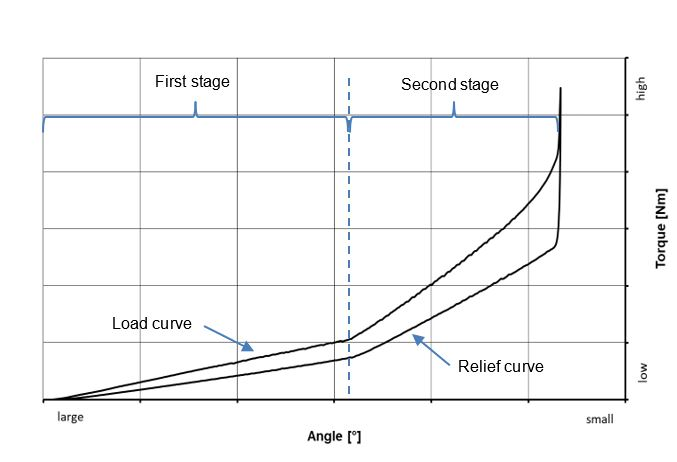
Representation of the friction hysteresis of a two-stage arc spring supported by a sliding shell in a torque-angle characteristic curve

In the case of two-stage spring there are two curved parallel arc springs, one inside the other, but the internal arc spring is shorter so that it acts later. The characteristic curve of the outer arc spring is adapted to increase when the engine is started. The softer outer arc spring only acts to increase the problematic resonance frequency range. When the torque increases, reaching the maximum value, the internal arc spring also acts. In this second phase, the inner and outer arc springs work together. The collaboration of both arc springs thus ensures good acoustic isolation at all engine speeds.

=== Three-phase bent spring ===
This curved spring consists of an outer and two inner arc springs with different elastic characteristics connected in series. This category of bent spring uses the two concepts together: parallel and series connection in order to ensure optimal torsional compensation for each value of torque.

== See also ==
- Centrifugal pendulum absorber
- Clutch
- Flywheel
- Flywheel energy storage
- Harmonic balancer
- List of moments of inertia
