= Damping torque =

Damping torque is provided by indicating instrument. Damper is a generic term used to identify any mechanism used for vibration energy absorption, the shaft vibration suppression, soft start and overload protection device. In order to design an efficient damper, it is imperative that the damping torque is calculated first. Damping torque or damping forces is the speed deviation of an electromechanical torque deviations of a machine while the angle deviation is called synchronizing torque [1]. In a measuring instrument, the damping torque is necessary to bring the moving system to rest to indicate steady reflection in a reasonable short time. It exists only as long as the pointer is in motion. Under the absence of damping torque the pointer oscillates for a short period of time and comes to steady position and this situation is called under damping. If the damping force is too large, then the pointer will come to rest slowly and this is called as over damping. Damping torque is a physical process of controlling a system's movement through producing motion that opposes the natural oscillation of a system. Similar to friction, it only acts when a system is in motion, and is not present if the system is at rest. Its primary purpose is to enable fast and accurate readings for an oscillating system. Instead of allowing an object to oscillate at its fundamental frequency forever, damping torque applies a counteractive force that slows the oscillation enough for a reading to be made. Although damping torque is used in many measurement devices, it is not something that has a set value, but instead is adjusted based on a pointer that is graphed on a deflection torque vs. time graph. Damping torque is an integral part in the measurement of moving systems because of its ability to control oscillation.

== Production ==
There are four different ways of producing damping torque, these include air friction damping, fluid friction damping, eddy current damping, and electromagnetic damping.

- Air friction damping is created by a piston oscillating in and out of an air chamber. When the piston enters the chamber it causes compression, when it exits the chamber there is a force acting back against it. This method is often used in the presence of a relatively weak electrical field, as air friction damping does not involve the use of any electric components that could distort the electrical field.
- Fluid friction damping is created through the oscillation of a disk in and out of liquid, normally oil, thus causing it to always oppose motion. This method is very similar to air friction damping, except rather than having air in a chamber, it is replaced with fluid. This method is hindered by the fact that it can only be done vertically, as it requires the liquid to be in an upright position.
- Eddy current damping is the use of an Eddy current and an electric field to create an electromagnetic torque that opposes motion. In this method the damping torque produced is proportional to the strength of the current and magnetic field. This method is very efficient, but it has the downside of distorting a weak electrical field.
- Electromagnetic damping is created by sending an electric current through a magnetic coil, causing a torque that goes against the natural movement of the coil. It has the similar disadvantage to the Eddy current damping in that it can distort the electrical field.

== Uses ==
Damping torque is used to allow fast and accurate measurement of an oscillating object. Due to inertia, an object in motion tends to stay in motion, thus requiring a counteracting force to bring it to its final rate of oscillation within a short time. Damping torque does this by opposing the natural oscillation, enabling the user to get an accurate reading. It is used in most experiments that involve gathering data of a system that is in motion, as one of the only ways to obtain accurate data. It also has many different methods of production as outlined above, allowing it to be used in many models where a counteractive force is required. Although, as noted above there are certain methods of creating damping torque that are only applicable to a system if it meets the correct requirements.

== Measurement ==
Damping torque is a motion that isn't assigned numbers while being used, but rather is tested and observed using a pointer in an experiment. A pointer of a device is the part that shows the damping torque based on a deflection torque vs time graph. This is done by taking into account both deflection and controlling torque in order to give the correct amount of damping torque. Deflection torque is what causes the pointer on the machine to oscillate, and the controlling torque is a counteractive force that stops the pointer from oscillating uncontrollably. Deflection torque and controlling torque work in a similar way to a scale, in that deflection torque is the weight that is pressed on the scale and the controlling torque is the counterweight that is used to balance out the initial weight. In order to get good results it is very important that these two forces equal one another.

=== Deflection and Controlling Torque Production ===
Deflection and controlling torque, like damping torque, are not explicitly measured, but can be created and thus controlled in different 2ways. By creating these two torques the pointer will move in a specific way that can be analyzed as shown below. Deflection torque can be any type of force that initially puts the system in motion. Controlling torque on the other hand is generated by a measuring device, and thus is not a naturally occurring motion. There are two ways of producing a controlling torque, spring control and gravity control:

- Spring control is created through the use of a control spring that is connected to the pointer of the system. When the system moves the spring is twisted in the opposite direction, thus creating a torque that directly counteracts the deflection torque.
- Gravity control is created by attaching small weights to a moving system, generating a torque based on the angle of deflection, which is the angle the back and forward tangents make with one another. This method is hindered by the fact that it requires the system to be vertical so that the weights can be acted on by gravity.

When analyzing the deflection and controlling torque there are three main categories, under damped, over damped, and critically damped. If a system is under damped it will not reach its final rate of oscillation in a timely manner, and will oscillate slowly for a long period of time. If it is over damped, the system will oscillate at a rate that is too slow to give an accurate reading. Finally, if it is critically damped, it has an equal amount of deflection and controlling torque, thus allowing the pointer to quickly find the correct value, without the system oscillating past that value. Critically damped means the machine has the right amount of damping torque and is ready to be used for experiments.
