= Torsional vibration =

Oscillation of a spinning object along its rotation axis

Torsional vibration is the angular vibration of an object—commonly a shaft—along its axis of rotation. Torsional vibration is often a concern in power transmission systems using rotating shafts or couplings, where it can cause failures if not controlled. A second effect of torsional vibrations applies to passenger cars. Torsional vibrations can lead to seat vibrations or noise at certain speeds. Both reduce the comfort.

In ideal power generation (or transmission) systems using rotating parts, the torques applied or reacted are "smooth" leading to constant speeds, and the rotating plane where the power is generated (input) and the plane it is taken out (output) are the same. In reality this is not the case. The torques generated may not be smooth (e.g., internal combustion engines) or the component being driven may not react to the torque smoothly (e.g., reciprocating compressors), and the power generating plane is normally at some distance to the power takeoff plane. Also, the components transmitting the torque can generate non-smooth or alternating torques (e.g., elastic drive belts, worn gears, misaligned shafts). Because no material can be infinitely stiff, these alternating torques applied at some distance on a shaft cause twisting vibration about the axis of rotation.

== Sources of torsional vibration ==
Torsional vibration can be introduced into a drive train by the power source. But even a drive train with a very smooth rotational input can develop torsional vibrations through internal components. Common sources are:

- Internal combustion engine: The torsional vibrations of the not continuous combustion and the crank shaft geometry itself cause torsional vibrations
- Reciprocating compressor: The pistons experience discontinuous forces from the compression.
- Universal joint: The geometry of this joint causes torsional vibrations if the shafts are not parallel.
- Stick–slip phenomenon: During the engagement of a friction element, stick slip situations create torsional vibrations.
- Lash: Drive train lash can cause torsional vibrations if the direction of rotation is changed or if the flow of power, i.e. driver vs. driven, is reversed.

== Crankshaft torsional vibration ==
Torsional vibration is a concern in the crankshafts of internal combustion engines because it could break the crankshaft itself; shear-off the flywheel; or cause driven belts, gears and attached components to fail, especially when the frequency of the vibration matches the torsional resonant frequency of the crankshaft. Causes of the torsional vibration are attributed to several factors.

- Alternating torques are generated by the slider-crank mechanism of the crankshaft, connecting rod, and piston.
  - The cylinder pressure due to combustion is not constant through the combustion cycle.
  - The slider-crank mechanism does not output a smooth torque even if the pressure is constant (e.g., at top dead centre there is no torque generated)
  - The motion of the piston mass and connecting rod mass generate alternating torques often referred to as "inertia" torques
- Engines with six or more cylinders in a straight line configuration can have very flexible crankshafts due to their long length.
- Two-stroke engines generally have smaller bearing overlap between the main and the pin bearings due to the larger stroke length, hence increasing the flexibility of the crankshaft due to decreased stiffness.
- There is inherently little damping in a crankshaft to reduce the vibration except for the shearing resistance of oil film in the main and conrod bearings.

If torsional vibration is not controlled in a crankshaft it can cause failure of the crankshaft or any accessories that are being driven by the crankshaft (typically at the front of the engine; the inertia of the flywheel normally reduces the motion at the rear of the engine). The couplings turn the vibration energy into heat. Therefore, and to ensure that the coupling is not damaged due to this (temperature could be very high, depending on the load), this is verified through torsional vibration calculation.

This potentially damaging vibration is often controlled by a torsional damper that is located at the front nose of the crankshaft (in automobiles it is often integrated into the front pulley). There are two main types of torsional dampers.

- Viscous dampers consist of an inertia ring in a viscous fluid. The torsional vibration of the crankshaft forces the fluid through narrow passages that dissipates the vibration as heat. The viscous torsional damper is analogous to the hydraulic shock absorber in a car's suspension.
- Tuned absorber type of "dampers" often referred to as a harmonic dampers or harmonic balancers (even though it technically does not damp or balance the crankshaft). This damper uses a spring element (often rubber in automobile engines) and an inertia ring that is typically tuned to the first torsional natural frequency of the crankshaft. This type of damper reduces the vibration at specific engine speeds when an excitation torque excites the first natural frequency of the crankshaft, but not at other speeds. This type of damper is analogous to the tuned mass dampers used in skyscrapers to reduce the building motion during an earthquake.

== Torsional vibrations in electromechanical drive systems ==
Torsional vibrations of drive systems usually result in a fluctuation of the rotational speed of the rotor of the driving electric motor. Such oscillations of the angular speed superimposed on the average rotor rotational speed cause perturbations of the electromagnetic flux, leading to additional oscillations of the electric currents in the motor windings. Then, the generated electromagnetic torque is also influenced by additional time-varying electromechanical interactions, which lead to further torsional vibrations of the drive system. According to the above, mechanical vibrations/oscillations of the drive system become coupled with the electrical oscillations of the motor windings' currents. Such coupling is typically nonlinear and presents a high computational burden.

Due to the highly nonlinear and coupled nature of electromechanical oscillations, approximations are often used, enabling such oscillations to be characterized analytically. To simplify the characterization of the oscillations between mechanical and electric systems, it is common to assume the mechanical and electrical components are uncoupled. Then, by holding either the mechanical or electrical aspect in steady-state, the characteristic of the other can be calculated. A common method is to apply electromagnetic torques generated by the electric motors as assumed excitation functions of time or of the rotor-to-stator slip, which are usually based on numerous experimental measurements carried out for a given electric motor's dynamic behaviour. For this purpose, by means of measurement results, i.e., empirically, formulas have been developed that provide good approximations for the electromagnetic external excitations produced by the electric motor. Although the electric currents flowing in the electric motor windings are accurate, the mechanical drive system is typically reduced to one or seldom to at most a few rotating rigid bodies. In many cases, such simplifications yield sufficiently useful results for engineering applications, but they can lead to inaccuracies since many qualitative dynamic properties of the mechanical systems, e.g., their mass distribution, torsional flexibility, and damping effects, are neglected. Thus, an influence of the oscillatory behaviour of drive systems on the electric machine rotor angular speed fluctuations, and in this way on the electric current oscillations in the rotor and stator windings, cannot be investigated with a satisfactory precision, excepting numerical methods, which can provide arbitrarily high accuracy.

Mechanical vibrations and deformations are phenomena associated with the operation of the majority of railway vehicle drivetrain structures. The knowledge about torsional vibrations in transmission systems of railway vehicles is of a great importance in the field of mechanical system dynamics. Torsional vibrations in railway vehicle drivetrains are generated by many coupled mechanisms, which are very complex and can be divided into two main parts:

1. The electromechanical interactions within the railway drivetrain system, including the electric motor, gears, and the driven parts of the disc and gear clutches.
2. Torsional vibrations of the flexible wheels and wheelsets caused by variations of the adhesion forces in the wheel-rail contact zone.

An interaction of the adhesion forces has nonlinear features which are related to the creep value and strongly depend on the wheel–rail zone conditions and the track geometry (especially when driving on a curved section of the track). In many modern mechanical systems, torsional structural deformability plays an important role. Often the study of railway vehicle dynamics using the rigid multibody methods without torsionally deformable elements are used This approach does not enable analysis of the self-excited vibrations, which have an important influence on the wheel–rail longitudinal interaction. A dynamic modelling of the electrical drive systems coupled with elements of a driven machine or vehicle is particularly important when the purpose of such modelling is to obtain an information about the transient phenomena of system operation, like run-up, run-down, and the loss of adhesion in the wheel-rail zone. The modelling of an electromechanical interaction between the electric driving motor and the machine also influence the self-excited torsional vibrations in the drive system.

== Measuring torsional vibration on physical systems ==
The most common way to measure torsional vibration is the approach of using equidistant pulses over one shaft revolution. Dedicated shaft encoders as well as gear tooth pickup transducers (induction, hall-effect, variable reluctance, etc.) can generate these pulses. The resulting encoder pulse train is converted into either a digital rpm reading or a voltage proportional to the rpm.

The use of a dual-beam laser is another technique that is used to measure torsional vibrations. The operation of the dual-beam laser is based on the difference in reflection frequency of two perfectly aligned beams pointing at different points on a shaft. Despite its specific advantages, this method yields a limited frequency range, requires line-of-sight from the part to the laser, and represents multiple lasers in case several measurement points need to be measured in parallel.

== Torsional vibration software ==
There are many software packages that are capable of solving the torsional vibration system of equations. Torsional vibration specific codes are more versatile for design and system validation purposes and can produce simulation data that can readily compared to published industry standards. These codes make it easy to add system branches, mass-elastic data, steady-state loads, transient disturbances and many other items only a rotordynamicist would need. Torsional vibration specific codes:

- AxSTREAM RotorDynamics – Commercial FEA-based program for performing the full scope of torsional analyses on the complete range of rotating equipment. Can be used to perform steady-state and transient, modal, harmonic and reciprocating machines analysis, and generates stability plot and Campbell diagrams quickly.
- ARMD TORSION – Commercial FEA-based software for performing damped and undamped torsional natural frequencies, mode shapes, steady-state and time-transient response of mechanical drive trains with inputs of various types of external excitation, synchronous motor start-up torque, compressor torques, and electrical system disturbances.

Bond Graphs can be used to analyse torsional vibrations in generator sets, such as those used aboard ships.

== See also ==
- Torsion (mechanics)
- Torsion coefficient
- Torsion spring or -bar
- Torque
- Damping torque

== Bibliography ==
- Nestorides, E.J., BICERA: A Handbook on Torsional Vibration, University Press, 1958, ISBN 0-521-04326-3
- Parikyan, T. (2011). "Multi-cycle torsional vibration simulation with AVL EXCITE Designer". ASME 2011 Internal Combustion Engine Division Fall Technical Conference. Vol. ASME Paper ICEF2011-60091. pp. 1009–1018. doi:10.1115/ICEF2011-60091. ISBN 978-0-7918-4442-7.
