= Harmonic damper =

Vibration damping system in an engine

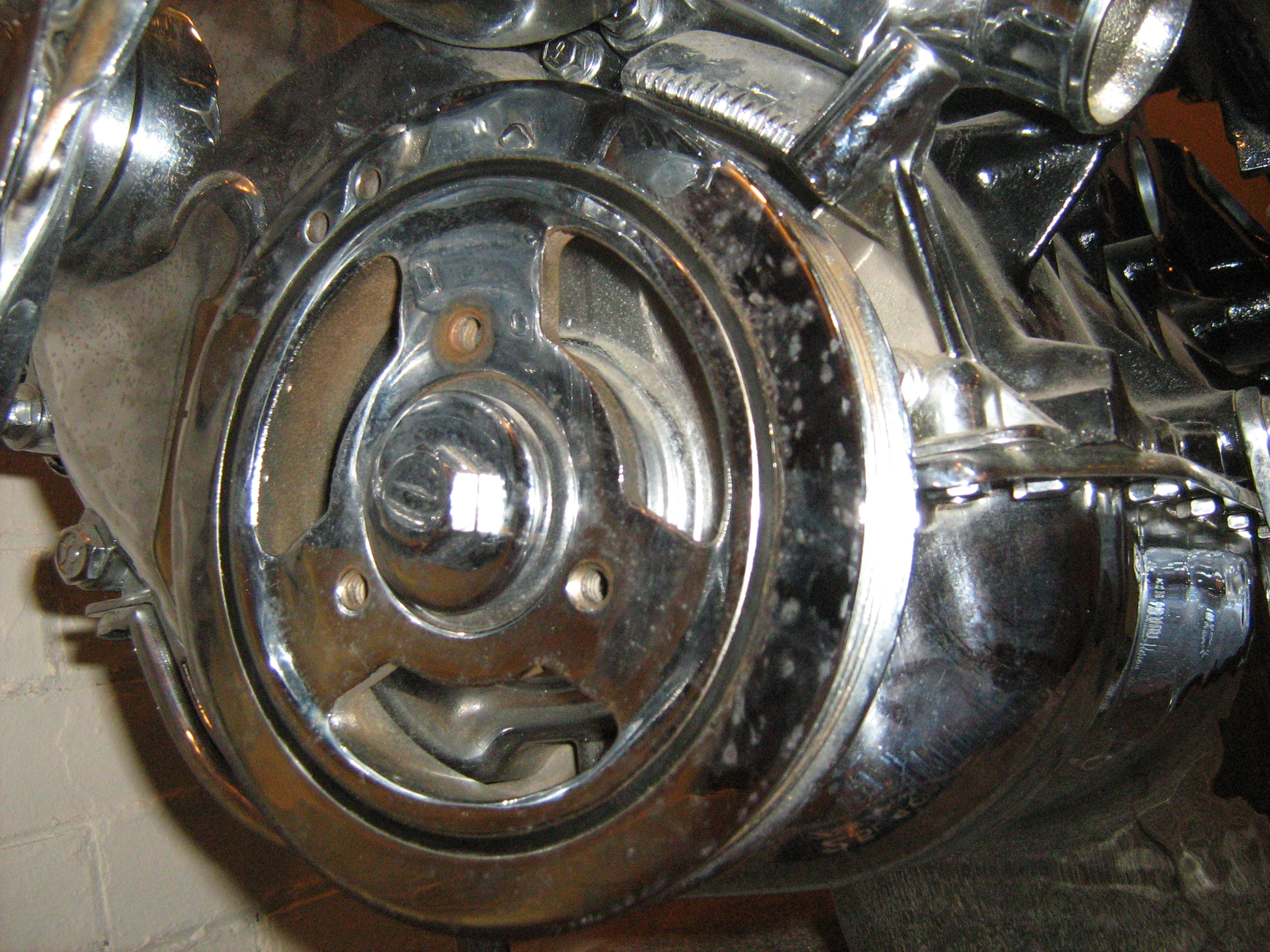
Harmonic balancer lower pulley on a four-cylinder engine

A harmonic damper is a device fitted to the free (accessory drive) end of the crankshaft of an internal combustion engine to counter torsional and resonance vibrations from the crankshaft. This device must be an interference fit to the crankshaft in order to operate in an effective manner. An interference fit ensures the device moves in perfect step with the crankshaft. It is essential on engines with long crankshafts (such as straight-six or straight-eight engines) and V8 engines with cross plane cranks, or V6 and straight-three engines with uneven firing order. Harmonics and torsional vibrations can greatly reduce crankshaft life, or cause instantaneous failure if the crankshaft runs at or through an amplified resonance. Dampers are designed with a specific weight (mass) and diameter, which are dependent on the damping material/method used, to reduce mechanical Q factor, or damp, crankshaft resonances.

A harmonic balancer (sometimes called crankshaft damper, torsional damper, or vibration damper) is the same thing as a harmonic damper except that the balancer includes a counterweight to externally balance the rotating assembly. The harmonic balancer often serves as a pulley for the accessory drive belts turning the alternator, water pump and other crankshaft driven devices.

== Need ==
The need for a damper will depend on the age of the engine design, its manufacture, strength of components, usable powerband, rev range and, most importantly, the quality of the engine's tune. The engine's tune especially in computer controlled applications can have a dramatic effect on durability, the aggressiveness of the tune puts the engine at risk of detonation which can be catastrophic to all rotating assembly components. With or without the presence of a damper, a crankshaft will act as a torsional spring to some extent. Impulses applied to the crankshaft by the connecting rods will "wind" this spring, which will respond (as a spring–mass system) by unwinding and re-winding in the opposite direction. This crankshaft winding will usually be damped out naturally. However, at certain crankshaft rotational speeds, such winding can overlap with the crankshaft's natural resonant frequency, thereby increasing the frequency's amplitude and possibly leading to crankshaft damage.

== Torsional crankshaft movement and harmonics ==
Each time a cylinder fires, the force of the combustion is imparted to the crankshaft rod journal. The rod journal deflects in a torsional motion to some degree under this force. Harmonic vibrations result from the torsional motion imparted on the crankshaft. These harmonics are a function of many factors including frequencies created by the actual combustion and the natural frequencies the metals make under the stresses of combustion and flexing. In some engines, the torsional motion of the crankshaft at certain speeds can synchronize with the harmonic vibrations, causing a resonance. In some cases the resonance may stress the crankshaft to the point of cracking or complete failure.

== Countering torsional crank motion and harmonic vibration ==
The harmonic balancer helps minimize torsional crankshaft harmonics and resonance. The damper is composed of two elements: an inertia mass and an energy dissipating element. Most often made of rubber, this element may be composed of a synthetic elastomer, a clutch, a spring or fluid. The mass counteracts the torsional crank motions and in concert with the energy dissipating element absorbs the harmonic vibrations.

== Construction ==
An OEM damper consists of an outer mass bonded/vulcanized to an inner hub. An aftermarket performance damper consists of a mass which is attached/mounted to a housing (steel, aluminum, titanium, etc.) based on the different types of damper and where the mass is controlled differently. The first three use older technology; First is the liquid type damper which surrounds the mass immersed in the housing which is then bonded or welded together. Second is the o-ring type which surrounds the mass with a number of o-rings as it sits in its housing. Third is the friction type which has clutches and spring acting on the mass inside the outer housing. Fourth is the newest type in which the mass sits over and is attached an elastomer ring which is then attached to the outer housing. The crankshaft and damper together become (in its torsional response) a spring–mass–damper system again which can only occur by the two being interference fit together.

== Identification ==
The damper will be fitted at the front of the engine (opposite the clutch or transmission) just beyond the cover of the timing chain, gears, or belt, and behind the accessory drive pulley (which may carry one or more V, serpentine, or cogged belts.) In older vehicles the pulley and damper were separate units that were bolted together. In late model vehicles the two have been combined into one unit. Timing marks are almost always engraved for purposes of setting the ignition timing.

== Maintenance ==
OE dampers are predominantly made using rubber as the bonding agent between the inner hub and the outer mass. Rubber is susceptible to operational and environmental factors. Rubber only has a finite ability to withstand operating temperatures plus any fluids that may find their way onto the damper. They are also susceptible to low temperatures which can make the rubber brittle. Any cracking of the elastomer(rubber) would be an immediate indicator of the need to replace the unit. OE dampers must be balanced, unless acting as an external balancer (Harmonic Balancer), as the quality of materials (usually cast or sintered iron) do not lend themselves to acceptable/perfect balance specifications straight from manufacturing. Most aftermarket dampers are rebuildable, excluding the fluid type. When used in racing (drag, circle track, road race, etc.) they require regular inspection to ensure their proper function. When used on street driven vehicles, the damper manufacturer can provide inspection and service intervals based on the particulars of the engine the damper is being used on.

== Effects of removal ==
This will depend on a number of factors from quality of engine materials used to engine balance to the type of crankshaft design the quality of engine tune and more. Engines have continually improved in nearly all aspects but most importantly in quality of materials used and their manufacture (also discussed in Engine design, materials & other factors above). These improvements range from forged crankshafts, pistons and rods to other rotational components. Engine balance has also improved significantly through more advanced balancing techniques and the higher quality engine components which make the balancing process easier. Many OE manufacturers have been achieving 0 gram balance across their production since the 1980s. Crankshaft design is also a factor as cross plane crankshafts can be the most susceptible to internal harmonic damage. Flat plane crankshafts, I format and H format engines do not exhibit these issues but can reach extreme output and RPM levels where a harmonic damper may be necessary. Last is the quality of the tune which can be one of the most significant factors due to all sorts of negatives associated with poor tunes from detonation to over-boosting. Other factors like piston pin offset, TDC dwell time and stroke length can be factors but are primarily limited to cross plane engines.

== Original invention ==
Both Frederick Henry Royce and Frederick W. Lanchester have strong claims to the invention of the vibration damper, with the latest research showing Rolls-Royce using a crankshaft slipper (friction) vibration damper on their 1906 30HP models; however, Royce had not submitted it for patent. Lanchester had developed a theoretical multi-plate viscous design in 1910 (patent 21,139, 12 September 1910). This design was adopted by the Daimler Company and employed on their six-cylinder engines for a number of years. Royce developed a viscous damper in 1912 that was then further developed and carried through to the B60 engine of the 1950s.

== See also ==
- Balance shaft
- Engine balance
- Noise and vibration on maritime vessels
- Tuned mass damper
