= Critical speed =

Theoretical angular velocity that excites the natural frequency of a rotating object

In solid mechanics, in the field of rotordynamics, the critical speed is the theoretical angular velocity that excites the natural frequency of a rotating object, such as a shaft, propeller, leadscrew, or gear. As the speed of rotation approaches the object's natural frequency, the object begins to resonate, which dramatically increases system vibration. The resulting resonance occurs regardless of orientation. When the rotational speed is equal to the natural frequency, then that speed is referred to as a critical speed.

== Critical speed of shafts ==
All rotating shafts, even in the absence of external load, will deflect during rotation. The unbalanced mass of the rotating object causes deflection that will create resonant vibration at certain speeds, known as the critical speeds. The magnitude of deflection depends upon the following:

- Stiffness of the shaft and its support
- Total mass of shaft and attached parts
- Unbalance of the mass with respect to the axis of rotation
- The amount of damping in the system

In general, it is necessary to calculate the critical speed of a rotating shaft, such as a fan shaft, in order to avoid issues with noise and vibration.

== Critical-speed equation ==
Like vibrating strings and other elastic structures, shafts and beams can vibrate in different mode shapes, with corresponding natural frequencies. The first vibrational mode corresponds to the lowest natural frequency. Higher modes of vibration correspond to higher natural frequencies. Often when considering rotating shafts, only the first natural frequency is needed.

There are two main methods used to calculate critical speed—the Rayleigh–Ritz method and Dunkerley's method. Both calculate an approximation of the first natural frequency of vibration, which is assumed to be nearly equal to the critical speed of rotation. The Rayleigh–Ritz method is discussed here. For a shaft that is divided into n segments, the first natural frequency for a given beam, in rad/s, can be approximated as
$$\omega_1 \approx \sqrt{\frac{g \sum_{i=1}^n w_i y_i}{\sum_{i=1}^n w_i y_i^2}},$$
where g is the acceleration of gravity, the $w_i$ are the weights of each segment, and the $y_i$ are the static deflections (under gravitational loading only) of the center of each segment. Generally speaking, if n is 2 or higher, this method tends to slightly overestimate the first natural frequency, with the estimate becoming better the higher n is. If n is only 1, this method tends to underestimate the first natural frequency, but the equation simplifies to
$$\omega_1 \approx \sqrt{\frac{g}{y_\text{max}}},$$
where $y_\text{max}$ is the maximal static deflection of the shaft. These speeds are in rad/s, but can be converted to RPM by multiplying by $\tfrac{60}{2\pi}.$

If a beam has multiple types of loading, deflections can be found for each, and then summed. If the shaft diameter changes along its length, deflection calculations become much more difficult due to response of the shafts rigidity towards different types of loading.

The static deflection expresses the relationship between rigidity of the shaft and inertial forces; it includes all the loads applied to the shaft when placed horizontally. However, the relationship is valid no matter what the orientation of the shaft is.

A system's critical speeds depend upon the magnitude, location, and relative phase of shaft unbalance, the shaft's geometry and mechanical properties, and the stiffness and mass properties of the support structure. Many practical applications suggest as good practice that the maximum operating speed should not exceed 75% of the critical speed; however, some systems operate above the first critical speed, or supercritically. In such cases, it is important to accelerate the shaft through the first natural frequency quickly so that large deflections don't develop.

== See also ==
- Damping ratio
- Oscillate
- Natural frequency
- Resonance
- Campbell diagram
- Vibration
