= Condition monitoring =

Monitoring process in machinery

Condition monitoring (colloquially, CM) is the process of monitoring a parameter of condition in machinery (vibration, temperature etc.), in order to identify a significant change which is indicative of a developing fault. It is a major component of predictive maintenance. The use of condition monitoring allows maintenance to be scheduled, or other actions to be taken to prevent consequential damages and avoid its consequences. Condition monitoring has a unique benefit in that conditions that would shorten normal lifespan can be addressed before they develop into a major failure. Condition monitoring techniques are normally used on rotating equipment, auxiliary systems and other machinery like belt-driven equipment, (compressors, pumps, electric motors, internal combustion engines, presses), while periodic inspection using non-destructive testing (NDT) techniques and fit for service (FFS) evaluation are used for static plant equipment such as steam boilers, piping and heat exchangers.

== Condition monitoring technology ==
The following list includes the main condition monitoring techniques applied in the industrial and transportation sectors:

- Condition monitoring overview
- Vibration analysis and diagnostics
- Lubricant analysis
- Acoustic emission
- Infrared thermography
- Ultrasound
- Oil condition sensors
- Motor condition monitoring and motor current signature analysis (MCSA)
- Model-based voltage and current systems (MBVI systems)

Most CM technologies are being standardized by ISO and ASTM.

== Rotating equipment ==
Rotating equipment is an industry umbrella term that includes gearboxes, reciprocating and centrifugal machinery.

The most commonly used method for rotating machines is vibration analysis.

Measurements can be taken on machine bearing casings with accelerometers (seismic or piezo-electric transducers) to measure the casing vibrations, and on the vast majority of critical machines, with eddy-current transducers that directly observe the rotating shafts to measure the radial (and axial) displacement of the shaft. The level of vibration can be compared with historical baseline values such as former start ups and shutdowns, and in some cases established standards such as load changes, to assess the severity. Machinery and parts OEM also define vibration limits based on the machine design or of the internal parts, e.g. fault frequencies of bearings.

Interpreting the vibration signal obtained is an elaborate procedure that requires specialized training and experience. It is simplified by the use of state-of-the-art technologies that provide the vast majority of data analysis automatically and provide information instead of raw data. One commonly employed technique is to examine the individual frequencies present in the signal. These frequencies correspond to certain mechanical components (for example, the various pieces that make up a rolling-element bearing) or certain malfunctions (such as shaft unbalance or misalignment). By examining these frequencies and their harmonics, the CM specialist can often identify the location and type of problem, and sometimes the root cause as well. For example, high vibration at the frequency corresponding to the speed of rotation is most often due to residual imbalance and is corrected by balancing the machine. A degrading rolling-element bearing, on the other hand, will usually exhibit vibration signals at specific frequencies increasing in intensity as it wears. Special analysis instruments can detect this wear weeks or even months before failure, giving ample warning to schedule replacement before a failure which could cause a much longer down-time. Beside all sensors and data analysis it is important to keep in mind that more than 80% of all complex mechanical equipment fail accidentally and without any relation to their life-cycle period.

Most vibration analysis instruments today utilize a fast Fourier transform (FFT) which is a special case of the generalized discrete Fourier transform and converts the vibration signal from its time domain representation to its equivalent frequency domain representation. However, frequency analysis (sometimes called Spectral Analysis or Vibration Signature Analysis) is only one aspect of interpreting the information contained in a vibration signal. Frequency analysis tends to be most useful on machines that employ rolling element bearings and whose main failure modes tend to be the degradation of those bearings, which typically exhibit an increase in characteristic frequencies associated with the bearing geometries and constructions. Depending on the type of machine, its typical malfunctions, the bearing types employed, rotational speeds, and other factors, the CM specialist may use additional diagnostic tools, such as examination of the time domain signal, the phase relationship between vibration components and a timing mark on the machine shaft (often known as a keyphasor), historical trends of vibration levels, the shape of vibration, and numerous other aspects of the signal along with other information from the process such as load, bearing temperatures, flow rates, valve positions and pressures to provide an accurate diagnosis. This is particularly true of machines that use fluid bearings rather than rolling-element bearings. To enable them to look at this data in a more simplified form vibration analysts or machinery diagnostic engineers have adopted a number of mathematical plots to show machine problems and running characteristics, these plots include the bode plot, the waterfall plot, the polar plot and the orbit time base plot amongst others.

Handheld data collectors and analyzers are now commonplace on non-critical or balance of plant machines on which permanent on-line vibration instrumentation cannot be economically justified. The technician can collect data samples from a number of machines, then download the data into a computer where the analyst (and sometimes artificial intelligence) can examine the data for changes indicative of malfunctions and impending failures. For larger, more critical machines where safety implications, production interruptions (so-called "downtime"), replacement parts, and other costs of failure can be appreciable (determined by the criticality index), a permanent monitoring system is typically employed rather than relying on periodic handheld data collection. However, the diagnostic methods and tools available from either approach are generally the same.

Recently also on-line condition monitoring systems have been applied to heavy process industries such as water, steel, oil & gas, pulp & paper, mining, petrochemical and wind power generation.

Performance monitoring is a less well-known condition monitoring technique. It can be applied to rotating machinery such as pumps and turbines, as well as stationary items such as boilers and heat exchangers. Measurements are required of physical quantities: temperature, pressure, flow, speed, displacement, according to the plant item. Absolute accuracy is rarely necessary, but repeatable data is needed. Calibrated test instruments are usually needed, but some success has been achieved in plant with DCS (Distributed Control Systems). Performance analysis is often closely related to energy efficiency, and therefore has long been applied in steam power generation plants. In some cases, it is possible to calculate the optimum time for overhaul to restore degraded performance.

Model-based voltage and current systems (MBVI systems): This is a technique that makes use of the information available from the current and voltage signals across all three phases simultaneously. Model-based systems are able to identify many of the same phenomena also seen by more conventional techniques, covering electrical, mechanical, and operational areas. Model-based systems work on the lines shown in Figure 6 below and measure both current and voltage while the motor is in operation and then automatically creates a mathematical model of the relationship between current and voltage. By applying this model to the measured voltage, a modelled current is calculated and this is compared with the actual measured current. Deviations between the measured current and the modelled current represent imperfections in the motor and driven equipment system, which can be analysed using a combination of Park's vector to simplify the three-phase currents into two orthogonal phases (D&Q), Fourier analysis to give a power spectral density plot, and algorithmic assessment of the resulting spectrum to identify specific faults or failure modes. These systems are designed for permanent installation as a condition monitoring solution rather than as a short-term diagnostic measurement device, and their outputs can be integrated into normal plant systems. Being permanently connected, historic trends are automatically captured.

The sort of output that these types of device can create include single screen, traffic light displays of the overall equipment operation, together with diagnosis of a range of mechanical, electrical, and operational problems, and trend plots showing how these parameters are changing through time. The concept of this type of device is that it can be used by normal plant operators and maintainers without the need for specialist interpretation of spectra, although the underlying spectral plots are available if required. The sort of faults that can be detected include a range of mechanical problems such as imbalance, misalignment, and bearing problems in the motor and driven equipment, as well as electrical problems including insulation breakdown, loose stator windings, rotor slot problems, current or voltage imbalance, and harmonic distortion. Because these systems measure both current and voltage, they also monitor power and are able to identify problems caused by unusual operating conditions and identify causes of lost efficiency. Because model-based systems only examine the difference between actual and predicted currents, they effectively filter out all the normal electrical signals that are so apparent in conventional Motor Current Spectral Analysis (MCSA), leaving a much simpler set of signals to be analysed. Because these systems are based on the relationship between voltage and current, they deal well with inverter driven systems where the input voltage may be of a variable frequency and there may be a noisy waveform high in harmonic components. Model-based systems effectively filter out all this noise in the voltage signal from the resulting current signal, leaving just the underlying imperfections. This ease of use and low cost of this type of equipment makes it appropriate for lower cost, lower criticality equipment.

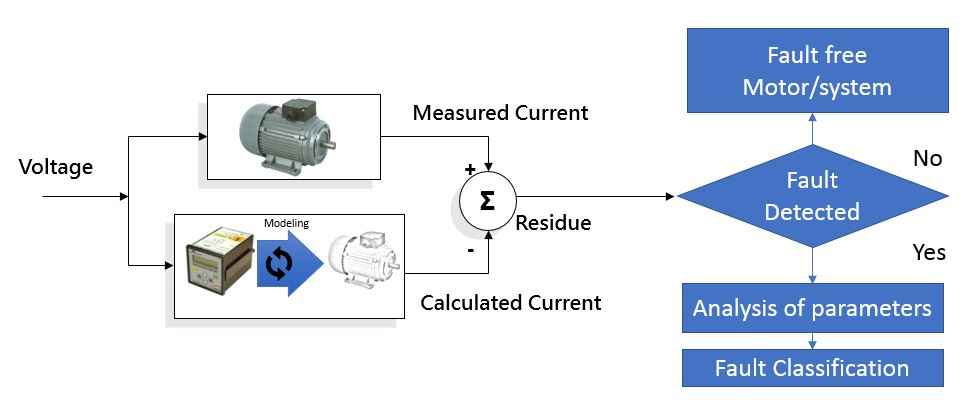
Model based systems concept

== Other techniques ==
- Often visual inspections are considered to form an underlying component of condition monitoring, however this is only true if the inspection results can be measured or critiqued against a documented set of guidelines. For these inspections to be considered condition monitoring, the results and the conditions at the time of observation must be collated to allow for comparative analysis against the previous and future measurements. The act of simply visually inspecting a section of pipework for the presence of cracks or leaks cannot be considered condition monitoring unless quantifiable parameters exist to support the inspection and a relative comparison is made against previous inspections. An act performed in isolation to previous inspections is considered a Condition Assessment, Condition Monitoring activities require that analysis is made comparative to previous data and reports the trending of that comparison.
- Slight temperature variations across a surface can be discovered with visual inspection and non-destructive testing with thermography. Heat is indicative of failing components, especially degrading electrical contacts and terminations. Thermography can also be successfully applied to high-speed bearings, fluid couplings, conveyor rollers, and storage tank internal build-up.
- A scanning electron microscope can take an image of a carefully taken sample of debris suspended in lubricating oil (taken from filters or magnetic chip detectors). Instruments then reveal the elements contained, their proportions, size and morphology. Using this method, the site, the mechanical failure mechanism and the time to eventual failure may be determined. This is called WDA – Wear Debris Analysis.
- Spectrographic oil analysis that tests the chemical composition of the oil can be used to predict failure modes. For example, a high silicon and aluminium content indicates contamination of dirt or grit (aluminium silicates) etc., and high iron levels indicate wearing components. Individually, elements give fair indications, but when used together they can very accurately determine failure modes e.g. for internal combustion engines, the presence of iron (liner), aluminium (piston) and chrome (rings) would indicate upper cylinder wear.
- Ultrasound can be used for high-speed and slow-speed mechanical applications and for high-pressure fluid situations. Digital ultrasonic meters measure high frequency signals from bearings and display the result as a dBuV (decibels per microvolt) value. This value is trended over time and used to predict increases in friction, rubbing, impacting, and other bearing defects. The dBuV value is also used to predict proper intervals for re-lubrication. Ultrasound monitoring, if done properly, proves out to be a great companion technology for vibration analysis.

Headphones allow humans to listen to ultrasound as well. A high pitched 'buzzing sound' in bearings indicates flaws in the contact surfaces, and when partial blockages occur in high pressure fluids the orifice will cause a large amount of ultrasonic noise. Ultrasound is used in the Shock Pulse Method of condition monitoring.

- Performance analysis, where the physical efficiency, performance, or condition is found by comparing actual parameters against an ideal model. Deterioration is typically the cause of difference in the readings. After motors, centrifugal pumps are arguably the most common machines. Condition monitoring by a simple head-flow test near duty point using repeatable measurements has long been used but could be more widely adopted. An extension of this method can be used to calculate the best time to overhaul a pump based on balancing the cost of overhaul against the increasing energy consumption that occurs as a pump wears. Aviation gas turbines are also commonly monitored using performance analysis techniques with the original equipment manufacturers such as Rolls-Royce plc routinely monitoring whole fleets of aircraft engines under Long Term Service Agreements (LTSAs) or Total Care packages.
- Wear Debris Detection Sensors are capable of detecting ferrous and non-ferrous wear particles within the lubrication oil giving considerable information about the condition of the measured machinery. By creating and monitoring a trend of what debris is being generated it is possible to detect faults prior to catastrophic failure of rotating equipment such as gearbox's, turbines, etc.

== The Criticality Index ==
The Criticality Index is often used to determine the degree on condition monitoring on a given machine taking into account the machines purpose, redundancy (i.e. if the machine fails, is there a standby machine which can take over), cost of repair, downtime impacts, health, safety and environment issues and a number of other key factors. The criticality index puts all machines into one of three categories:

1. Critical machinery – Machines that are vital to the plant or process and without which the plant or process cannot function. Machines in this category include the steam or gas turbines in a power plant, crude oil export pumps on an oil rig or the cracker in an oil refinery. With critical machinery being at the heart of the process it is seen to require full on-line condition monitoring to continually record as much data from the machine as possible regardless of cost and is often specified by the plant insurance. Measurements such as loads, pressures, temperatures, casing vibration and displacement, shaft axial and radial displacement, speed and differential expansion are taken where possible. These values are often fed back into a machinery management software package which is capable of trending the historical data and providing the operators with information such as performance data and even predict faults and provide diagnosis of failures before they happen.
2. Essential machinery – Units that are a key part of the process, but if there is a failure, the process still continues. Redundant units (if available) fall into this realm. Testing and control of these units is also essential to maintain alternative plans should critical machinery fail.
3. General purpose or balance of plant machines – These are the machines that make up the remainder of the plant and normally monitored using a handheld data collector as mentioned previously to periodically create a picture of the health of the machine.

== See also ==
- Machining vibrations
- Shock Pulse Method
- Health and Usage Monitoring Systems
