= Machining vibrations =

Relative movement between a machining tool and the workpiece

In machining, vibrations, also called chatter, are the relative movements between the workpiece and the cutting tool. These vibrations can range from quiet and barely noticeable to very violent vibrations. These vibrations can also be utilized for many purposes whether it be intentional or unintentional. The vibrations result in waves on the machined surface. This affects typical machining processes, such as turning, milling and drilling, and atypical machining processes, such as grinding.

A chatter mark is an irregular surface flaw left by a wheel that is out of true (off-center) in grinding, or regular marks left when turning a long piece on a lathe, due to machining vibrations.

As early as 1907, Frederick W. Taylor described machining vibrations as the most obscure and delicate of all the problems facing the machinist, an observation still true today, as shown in many publications on machining.

The explanation of the machine tool regenerative chatter was made by Tobias. S. A. and W. Fishwick in 1958, by modeling the feedback loop between the metal cutting process and the machine tool structure, and came with the stability lobes diagram. The structure stiffness, damping ratio and the machining process damping factor, are the main parameters that defines the limit where the machining process vibration is prone to enlarge with time.

Mathematical models make it possible to simulate machining vibration quite accurately, but in practice it is always difficult to avoid vibrations.

== Avoidance techniques ==
Basic rules for the machinist for avoiding vibrations:

- Make the workpiece, the tool and the machine as rigid as possible
- Choose the tool that will least excite vibrations (modifying angles, dimensions, surface treatment, etc.)
- Choose exciting frequencies that best limit the vibrations of the machining system (spindle speed, number of teeth and relative positions, etc.)
- Choose tools that incorporate vibration-damping technology (with structure damping using high damping material in the joint areas and with mass dampers using a counteracting force to stabilize the motion).

== Industrial context ==
The use of high speed machining (HSM) has enabled an increase in productivity and the realization of workpieces that were impossible before, such as thin walled parts. Unfortunately, machine centers are less rigid because of the very high dynamic movements. In many applications, i.e. long tools, thin workpieces, the appearance of vibrations is the most limiting factor and compels the machinist to reduce cutting speeds and feeds well below the capacities of machines or tools.

Vibration problems generally result in noise, bad surface quality and sometimes tool breakage. The main sources are of two types: forced vibrations and self-generated vibrations. Forced vibrations are mainly generated by interrupted cutting (inherent to milling), runout, or vibrations from outside the machine. Self generated vibrations are related to the fact that the actual chip thickness depends also on the relative position between tool and workpiece during the previous tooth passage. Thus increasing vibrations may appear up to levels which can seriously degrade the machined surface quality.

== Laboratory research ==
Industrial and academic researchers have widely studied machining vibration. Specific strategies have been developed, especially for thin-walled work pieces, by alternating small machining passes in order to avoid static and dynamic flexion of the walls. The length of the cutting edge in contact with the workpiece is also often reduced in order to limit self-generated vibrations.

The modeling of the cutting forces and vibrations, although not totally accurate, makes it possible to simulate problematic machining and reduce unwanted effects of vibration. Multiplication of the models based on stability lobe theory, which makes it possible to find the best spindle speed for machining, gives robust models for any kind of machining.

Time domain simulations compute workpiece and tool position on very small time scales without great sacrifice in accuracy of the instability process and of the surface modeled. These models need more computing resources than stability lobe models, but give greater freedom (cutting laws, runout, ploughing, finite element models). Time domain simulations are quite difficult to robustify, but a lot of work is being done in this direction in the research laboratories.

In addition to stability lobe theory, the use of variable tool pitch often gives good results, at a relatively low cost. These tools are increasingly proposed by tool manufacturers, although this is not really compatible with a reduction in the number of tools used. Other research leads are also promising, but often need major modifications to be practical in machining centers. Two kinds of software are very promising: Time domain simulations which give not yet reliable prediction but should progress, and vibration machining expert software, pragmatically based on knowledge and rules.

== Industrial methods used to limit machining vibrations ==
The usual method for setting up a machining process is still mainly based on historical technical knowhow and on trial and error method to determine the best parameters. According to the particular skills of a company, various parameters are studied in priority, such as depth of cut, tool path, workpiece set-up, and geometrical definition of the tool. When a vibration problem occurs, information is usually sought from the tool manufacturer or the CAM (Computer-aided manufacturing) software retailer, and they may give a better strategy for machining the workpiece. Sometimes, when vibration problems are too much of a financial prejudice, experts can be called upon to prescribe, after measurement and calculation, spindle speeds or tool modifications.

Compared to the industrial stakes, commercial solutions are rare. To analyse the problems and to propose solutions, only few experts propose their services. Computational software for stability lobes and measurement devices are proposed but, in spite of widespread publicity, they remain relatively rarely used. Lastly, vibration sensors are often integrated into machining centers but they are used mainly for wear diagnosis of the tools or the spindle. New Generation Tool Holders and especially the Hydraulic Expansion Tool Holders minimise the undesirable effects of vibration to a large extent. First of all, the precise control of total indicator reading to less than 3 micrometres helps reduce vibrations due to balanced load on cutting edges and the little vibration created thereon is absorbed largely by the oil inside the chambers of the Hydraulic Expansion Tool Holder.

The machining vibration is often coming from the tool holder having a high L/D ratio and low stiffness. Stiffening the tool holder with tungsten carbide material is widely used when the tool diameter/weight is small, and the material cost of tungsten carbide is not high. A longer reach at L/D above 4 until 14, a mass damper is necessary to effectively damp out the vibration with a counteracting force to the tool structure. The simple form of mass damper has a heavy weight (made of tungsten or lead) supported by rubber rings, with or without a tuning mechanism. The tuning mechanism enables the mass damper to cover a wider L/D ratio (associated with vibration frequency) range. A more advanced mass damper on cutting tools use viscous fluid or damping oil to improve the dampening efficiency at the targeted L/D ratio (vibration frequency). The latest mass damper on cutting tools are making use of special polymers that has frequency dependent stiffness, and use these polymers to make both self-tuning/adjusting to cover a wider L/D ratio.

The machine tools with sensors integrated, which can measure the vibration in machining and provide a feedback to automatically tune the mass damper, is already demonstrated in lab-scale. The deployment of such solutions is still pending on its ease of use and cost.

== See also ==
- Balancing machine
- Shock Pulse Method
