= Carl H. J. Schenck =

German entrepreneur

Carl Heinrich Johann Schenck was a German technology pioneer and businessman who established Carl Schenck Eisengießerei & Waagenfabrik in 1881, in Darmstadt, Germany. The company was the first manufacturer of the industrial balancing machine. It is known today as Carl Schenck AG, and has been a subsidiary of the global technology conglomerate, Dürr AG, since 1999.

== Memoriam ==
The Carl Schenck Award, offered annually by the Technical University in Darmstadt, is dedicated to him. The TU campus houses two units of Dürr's Measuring and Process Systems division: the Balancing and Assembly Products unit (BAP); and the Schenck Technologie und Industriepark.
