= Shock pulse method =

Shock pulse method (SPM) is a technique for using signals from rotating rolling bearings as the basis for efficient condition monitoring of machines. From the innovation of the method in 1969 by Eivind Olav Sohoel it has been further developed and broadened and is a worldwide accepted philosophy for condition monitoring of rolling bearings and machine maintenance.

== Difference between shock pulse and vibration ==
Difference between Shock Pulse and Vibration

Consider a metal ball hitting a metal bar. At the moment of impact, a pressure wave spreads through the material of both bodies (1). The wave is transient (quickly damps out). When the wave front hits the shock pulse transducer, it will cause a dampened oscillation of the transducer's reference mass. The peak amplitude is a function of the impact velocity (v).

During the next phase of the collision, both bodies start to vibrate (2). The frequency of this vibration is a function of the mass and the shape of the colliding bodies.

== Processing shock pulse signals ==
Processing shock pulse signals

A shock pulse transducer reacts with a large amplitude oscillation to the weak shock pulses, because it is excited at its resonance frequency of 32 kHz. Machine vibration, of a much lower frequency, is filtered out.

The first frame shows the symbol for a transducer and, below, the vibration signal from the machine, with superimposed transients at the resonance frequency, caused by shock pulses. The second frame shows the electric filter which passes a train of transients at 32 kHz. Their amplitudes depend on the energy of the shock pulses. The transients are converted into analogue electric pulses. The last frame shows the converted shock pulse signal from the bearing, now consisting of a rapid sequence of stronger electric pulses.

== Shock pulse patterns ==
Shock pulse patterns

The filtered transducer signal reflects the pressure variation in the rolling interface of the bearing. When the oil film in the bearing is thick, the shock pulse level is low, without distinctive peaks. The level increases when the oil film is reduced, but there are still no distinctive peaks. Damage causes strong pulses at irregular intervals.

== Measuring operating condition ==
The shock pulse meters measure the shock signal on a decibel scale, at two levels. A micro processor evaluates the signal. It needs input data defining the bearing type (ISO number) and the rolling velocity (RPM and bearing diameter).

Surface damage in bearings causes a large increase in shock pulse strength, combined with a notable change in the characteristics between stronger and weaker pulses. Shock values are thus immediately translated into measurements of relative oil film thickness or surface damage, whichever applies.

Measuring operating condition

== See also ==
- Condition monitoring
- Machining vibrations
- Spectrum analyzer
