= Rotordynamics =

Branch of applied mechanics dealing with rotating structures

Rotordynamics (or rotor dynamics) is a specialized branch of applied mechanics concerned with the behavior and diagnosis of rotating structures. It is commonly used to analyze the behavior of structures ranging from jet engines and steam turbines to auto engines and computer disk storage. At its most basic level, rotor dynamics is concerned with one or more mechanical structures (rotors) supported by bearings and influenced by internal phenomena that rotate around a single axis. The supporting structure is called a stator. As the speed of rotation increases the amplitude of vibration often passes through a maximum that is called a critical speed. This amplitude is commonly excited by imbalance of the rotating structure; everyday examples include engine balance and tire balance. If the amplitude of vibration at these critical speeds is excessive, then catastrophic failure occurs. In addition to this, turbomachinery often develop instabilities which are related to the internal makeup of turbomachinery, and which must be corrected. This is the chief concern of engineers who design large rotors.

Rotating machinery produces vibrations depending upon the structure of the mechanism involved in the process. Any faults in the machine can increase or excite the vibration signatures. Vibration behavior of the machine due to imbalance is one of the main aspects of rotating machinery which must be studied in detail and considered while designing. All objects including rotating machinery exhibit natural frequency depending on the structure of the object. The critical speed of a rotating machine occurs when the rotational speed matches its natural frequency. The lowest speed at which the natural frequency is first encountered is called the first critical speed, but as the speed increases, additional critical speeds are seen which are the multiples of the natural frequency. Hence, minimizing rotational unbalance and unnecessary external forces are very important to reducing the overall forces which initiate resonance. When the vibration is in resonance, it creates a destructive energy which should be the main concern when designing a rotating machine. The objective here should be to avoid operations that are close to the critical and pass safely through them when in acceleration or deceleration. If this aspect is ignored it might result in loss of the equipment, excessive wear and tear on the machinery, catastrophic breakage beyond repair or even human injury and loss of lives.

The real dynamics of the machine is difficult to model theoretically. The calculations are based on simplified models which resemble various structural components (lumped parameters models), equations obtained from solving models numerically (Rayleigh–Ritz method) and finally from the finite element method (FEM), which is another approach for modelling and analysis of the machine for natural frequencies. There are also some analytical methods, such as the distributed transfer function method, which can generate analytical and closed-form natural frequencies, critical speeds and unbalanced mass response. On any machine prototype it is tested to confirm the precise frequencies of resonance and then redesigned to assure that resonance does not occur.

== Basic principles ==
The equation of motion, in generalized matrix form, for an axially symmetric rotor rotating at a constant spin speed Ω is
$$\mathbf{M} \ddot{\mathbf{q}}(t) + (\mathbf{C} + \mathbf{G}) \dot{\mathbf{q}}(t) + (\mathbf{K} + \mathbf{N}) \mathbf{q}(t) = \mathbf{f}(t)$$
where:

M is the symmetric mass matrix;
C is the symmetric damping matrix;
G is the skew-symmetric gyroscopic matrix:
K is the symmetric bearing or seal stiffness matrix;
N is the gyroscopic matrix of deflection for inclusion of e.g., centrifugal elements;
q(t) is the generalized coordinates of the rotor in inertial coordinates;
f(t) is a forcing function, usually including the unbalance.

The gyroscopic matrix G is proportional to spin speed Ω. The general solution to the above equation involves complex eigenvectors which are spin speed dependent. Engineering specialists in this field rely on the Campbell Diagram to explore these solutions.

An interesting feature of the rotordynamic system of equations are the off-diagonal terms of stiffness, damping, and mass. These terms are called cross-coupled stiffness, cross-coupled damping, and cross-coupled mass. When there is a positive cross-coupled stiffness, a deflection will cause a reaction force opposite the direction of deflection to react the load, and also a reaction force in the direction of positive whirl. If this force is large enough compared with the available direct damping and stiffness, the rotor will be unstable. When a rotor is unstable, it will typically require immediate shutdown of the machine to avoid catastrophic failure.

== Jeffcott rotor ==
The Jeffcott rotor (named after Henry Homan Jeffcott), also known as the de Laval rotor in Europe, is a simplified lumped parameter model used to solve these equations. A Jeffcott rotor consists of a flexible, massless, uniform shaft mounted on two flexible bearings equidistant from a massive disk rigidly attached to the shaft. The simplest form of the rotor constrains the disk to a plane orthogonal to the axis of rotation. This limits the rotor's response to lateral vibration only. If the disk is perfectly balanced (i.e., its geometric center and center of mass are coincident), then the rotor is analogous to a single-degree-of-freedom undamped oscillator under free vibration. If there is some radial distance between the geometric center and center of mass, then the rotor is unbalanced, which produced a force proportional to the disk's mass, m, the distance between the two centers (eccentricity, ε) and the disk's spin speed, Ω. After calculating the equivalent stiffness, k, of the system, we can create the following second-order linear ordinary differential equation that describes the radial deflection of the disk from the rotor centerline.

$$m \mathbb{\ddot{r}} + k \mathbb{r} = m \varepsilon \Omega^2 \sin(\Omega t)$$

If we were to graph the radial response, we would see a sine wave with angular frequency $\Omega/2\pi$. This lateral oscillation is called 'whirl', and in this case, is highly dependent upon spin speed. Not only does the spin speed influence the amplitude of the forcing function, it can also produce dynamic amplification near the system's natural frequency.

While the Jeffcott rotor is a useful tool for introducing rotordynamic concepts, it is a mathematical idealization that only loosely approximates the behavior of real-world rotors.

== Campbell diagram ==
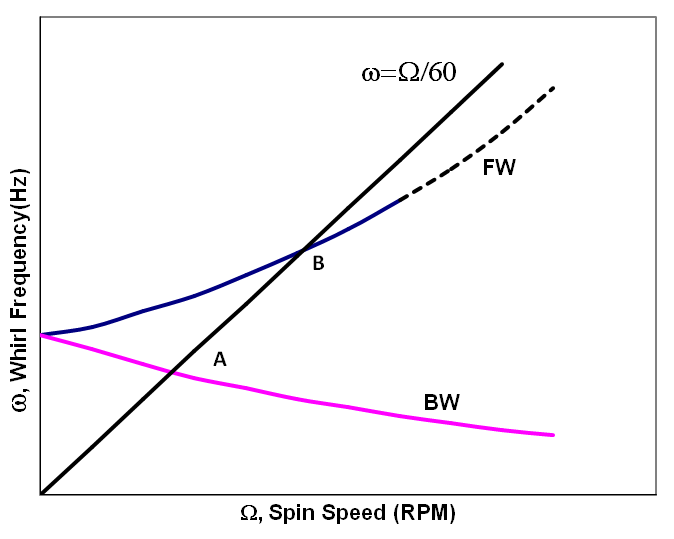
Campbell Diagram for a Simple Rotor

The Campbell diagram, also known as "Whirl Speed Map" or a "Frequency Interference Diagram", of a simple rotor system is shown on the right. The pink and blue curves show the backward whirl (BW) and forward whirl (FW) modes, respectively, which diverge as the spin speed increases. When the BW frequency or the FW frequency equal the spin speed Ω, indicated by the intersections A and B with the synchronous spin speed line, the response of the rotor may show a peak. This is called a critical speed.

== History ==
The history of rotordynamics is replete with the interplay of theory and practice. W. J. M. Rankine first performed an analysis of a spinning shaft in 1869, but his model was not adequate and he predicted that supercritical speeds could not be attained. In 1895, Dunkerley published an experimental paper describing supercritical speeds. Gustaf de Laval, a Swedish engineer, ran a steam turbine to supercritical speeds in 1889, and Kerr published a paper showing experimental evidence of a second critical speed in 1916.

Henry Jeffcott was commissioned by the Royal Society of London to resolve the conflict between theory and practice. He published a paper now considered classic in the Philosophical Magazine in 1919 in which he confirmed the existence of stable supercritical speeds. August Föppl published much the same conclusions in 1895, but history largely ignored his work.

Between the work of Jeffcott and the start of World War II there was much work in the area of instabilities and modeling techniques culminating in the work of N. O. Myklestad and M. A. Prohl which led to the transfer matrix method (TMM) for analyzing rotors. The most prevalent method used today for rotordynamics analysis is the finite element method.

Modern computer models have been commented on in a quote attributed to Dara Childs, "the quality of predictions from a computer code has more to do with the soundness of the basic model and the physical insight of the analyst. ... Superior algorithms or computer codes will not cure bad models or a lack of engineering judgment."

Prof. F. Nelson has written extensively on the history of rotordynamics and most of this section is based on his work.

== Software ==
There are many software packages that are capable of solving the rotor dynamic system of equations. Rotor dynamic specific codes are more versatile for design purposes. These codes make it easy to add bearing coefficients, side loads, and many other items only a rotordynamicist would need. The non-rotor dynamic specific codes are full featured FEA solvers, and have many years of development in their solving techniques. The non-rotor dynamic specific codes can also be used to calibrate a code designed for rotor dynamics.

Rotordynamic-specific Software
Name	Commercial / Academic	Description
Dynamics R4 (Alfa-Tranzit Co. Ltd)	Commercial	Software developed for design and analysis of spatial systems
AxSTREAM RotorDynamics, (SoftInWay)		Integrated Software platform for Rotor Dynamics, capable of lateral, torsional, and axial rotor dynamics for all widely used rotor types using the Finite Element Method on either beam or 2D-axisymmetric elements, and is capable of being automated.
Rotortest, (LAMAR - University of Campinas)		Finite Element Method based software, including different types of bearing solver. Developed by LAMAR (Laboratory of Rotating Machinery) - Unicamp (University of Campinas).
SAMCEF ROTOR		Software Platform for Rotors Simulation (LMS Samtech, A Siemens Business)
MADYN (Consulting engineers Klement)	Commercial	Combined finite element lateral, torsional, axial and coupled solver for multiple rotors and gears, including foundation and housing.
MADYN 2000 (DELTA JS Inc.)	Commercial	Combined finite element (3D Timoshenko beam) lateral, torsional, axial and coupled solver for multiple rotors and gears, foundations and casings (capability to import transfer functions and state space matrices from other sources), various bearings (fluid film, spring damper, magnetic, rolling element)
NASTRAN (MSC / Hexagon)	Commercial	Finite element code which can be used to compute Campbell diagrams through SOL 107.
iSTRDYN (DynaTech Software LLC)	Commercial	2-D Axis-symmetric finite element solver
FEMRDYN (DynaTech Engineering, Inc.)	Commercial	1-D Axis-symmetric finite element solver
DyRoBeS (Eigen Technologies, Inc.)	Commercial	1-D beam element solver
RIMAP (RITEC)	Commercial	1-D beam element solver
XLRotor (Rotating Machinery Analysis, Inc.)	Commercial	1-D beam element solver, including magnetic bearing control systems and coupled lateral-torsional analysis. A powerful, fast and easy to use tool for rotor dynamic modeling and analysis using Excel spreadsheets. Readily automated with VBA macros, plus a plugin for 3D CAD software.
ARMD (Rotor Bearing Technology & Software, Inc.)	Commercial	FEA-based software for rotordynamics, multi-branch torsional vibration, fluid-film bearings (hydrodynamic, hydrostatic, and hybrid) design, optimization, and performance evaluation, that is used worldwide by researchers, OEMs and end-users across all industries.
XLTRC2 (Texas A&M)	Academic	1-D beam element solver
ComboRotor (University of Virginia)		Combined finite element lateral, torsional, axial solver for multiple rotors evaluating critical speeds, stability and unbalance response extensively verified by industrial use
MESWIR (Institute of Fluid-Flow Machinery, Polish Academy of Sciences)	Academic	Computer code package for analysis of rotor-bearing systems within the linear and non-linear range
RoDAP (D&M Technology)	Commercial	Lateral, torsional, axial and coupled solver for multiple rotors, gears and flexible disks(HDD)
ROTORINSA (ROTORINSA)	Commercial	Finite element software developed by a French engineering school (INSA-Lyon) for analysis of steady-state dynamic behavior of rotors in bending.
COMSOL Multiphysics, Rotordynamics Module add-on (Rotordynamics Module)		
RAPPID - (Rotordynamics-Seal Research)	Commercial	Finite element based software library (3D solid and beam elements) including rotordynamic coefficient solvers

== See also ==
- Axle
- Balancing machine
- Bearing (mechanical)
- Driveshaft
- Exoskeletal engine
- Magnetic bearing
- Turbine
- Wind Turbine
