= Joseph Chaley =

French civil engineer (1795–1861)

Joseph Chaley (1795 – April 15, 1861) was a French civil engineer and a pioneer designer of suspension bridges in the 19th century. He was a medical officer in the army before becoming a bridge designer.

Chaley pioneered the construction of suspension bridge cables by bringing together individual wire strands in mid-air, a technique later known as aerial spinning. Previously, the entire cable had been bound together before lifting into place, but Chaley's system, inspired by the ideas of Louis Vicat, allowed considerably longer cables to be erected at less cost.

He built the Grand Pont Suspendu at Fribourg in 1834, a world record-breaking span of 273m, only overtaken 16 years later by Charles Ellet Jr.'s 308m span Wheeling Suspension Bridge. Chaley had previously worked with Marc Seguin's brother Jules on the Tarascon-Beaucaire Bridge (1828) and also the Chazey-sur-Ain Bridge (1829).

Chaley first presented a proposal for the Grand Pont Suspendu in February 1830, and was awarded the contract in June of that year. His estimated cost of less than 300,000 florins was well below other competitors, including Guillaume Henri Dufour. Chaley's bridge was supported on four main cables (two per side), each consisting of 1056 wires each 3.08mm in diameter. It carried 2000 people on its opening day. It was replaced in 1923 by a reinforced concrete arch bridge.

Chaley's other suspension bridges include the 227m Pont du Gottéron (1840); and a 64m span at Collomby in Valais (1840). He collaborated with Bordillon on the Basse-Chaîne Bridge at Angers, completed in 1839. This bridge collapsed in 1850 killing 226 soldiers, a major setback to suspension bridge construction in France and beyond.

His only bridge still in existence is the 121m suspension bridge at Corbières (1837).
