= Angers Bridge =

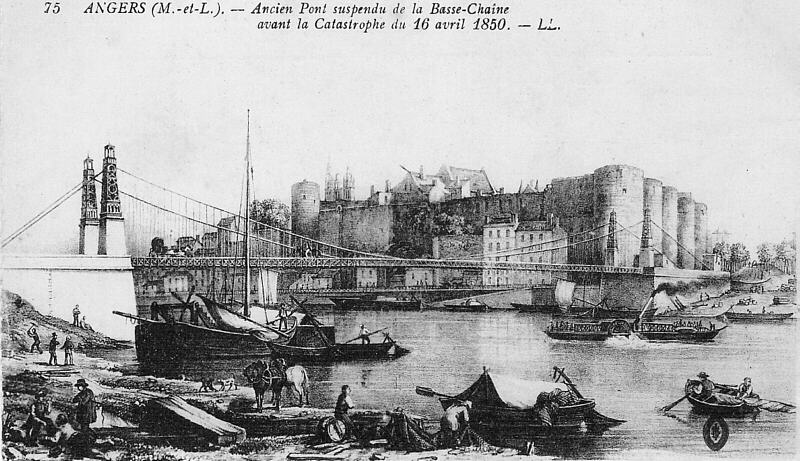
- Coordinates: 47°28′14″N 0°33′50″W
- Crossed: Maine River
- Locale: Angers, France
- Other name: Basse-Chaîne Bridge

Characteristics
- Design: Suspension bridge
- Material: Cast iron
- Width: 7.2 m (24 ft)
- Height: 5.47 m (17.9 ft)
- Longest span: 102 m (335 ft)

History
- Designer: Joseph Chaley and Bordillon
- Construction start: 1836
- Opened: 1839
- Collapsed: 16 April 1850

Location
- Interactive map of Angers Bridge

Angers Bridge, also called the Basse-Chaîne Bridge, was a suspension bridge over the Maine River in Angers, France. It was designed by Joseph Chaley and Bordillon, and built between 1836 and 1839. The bridge collapsed on 16 April 1850, while a battalion of French soldiers were marching across it, killing over 200.

The bridge spanned 102 m (335 ft), with two wire cables carrying a deck 7.2 m (24 ft) wide. Its towers consisted of cast iron columns 5.47 m (17.9 ft) tall.

== Collapse ==
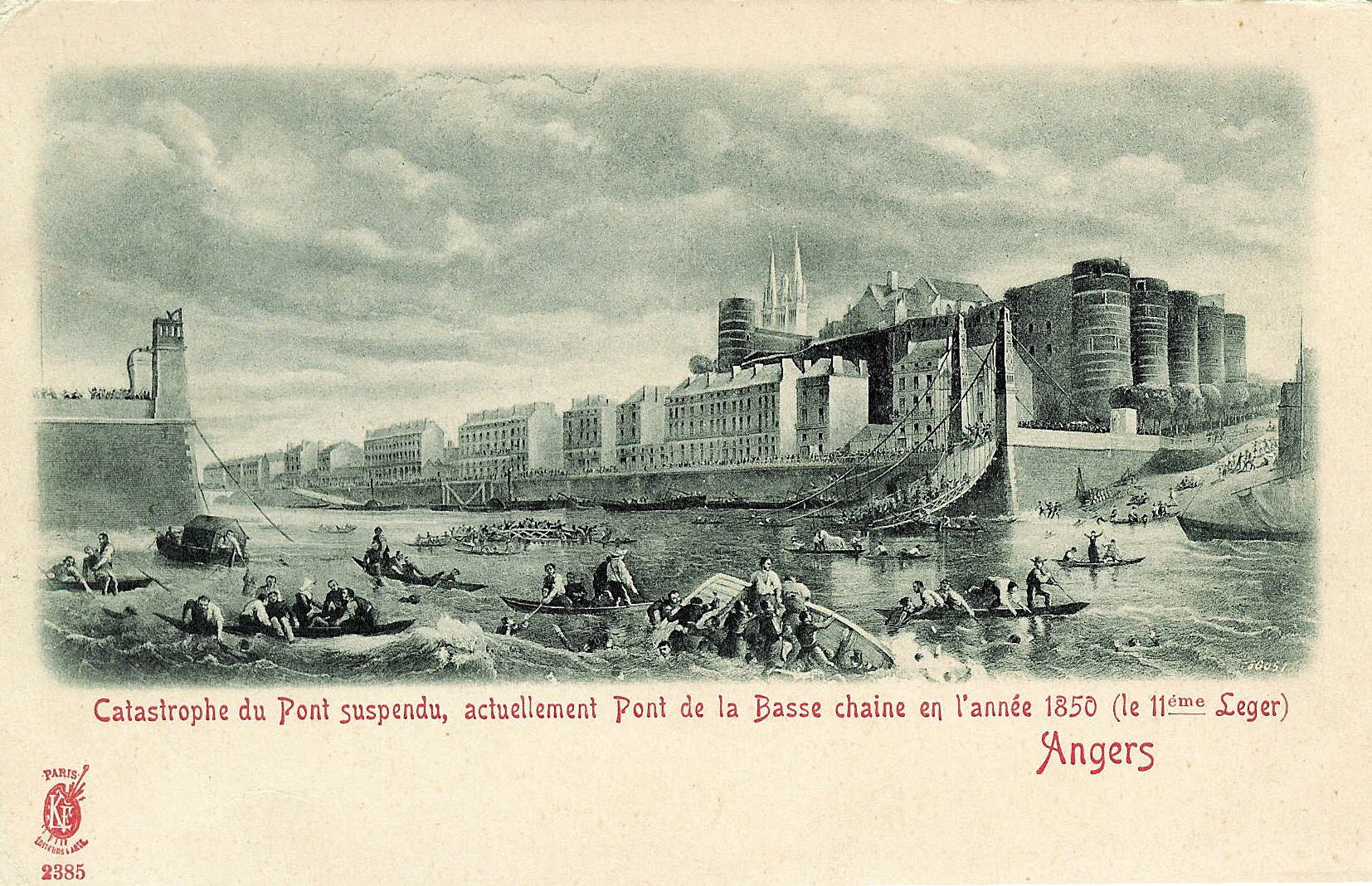
Collapsed Basse-Chaîne Bridge

Soldiers stationed in the region frequently used the bridge, and two battalions of the same regiment had crossed earlier that day. The third battalion arrived during a powerful thunderstorm when the wind was making the bridge oscillate. When the soldiers began to cross, their bodies acted as sails, further catching the wind. Survivors reported that they had been walking as if drunk and could barely keep themselves from falling, first to one side and then to the other. As usual in crossing that bridge, the soldiers had been ordered to break step and to space themselves farther apart than normal. However, their efforts to match the swaying and keep their balance may have caused them to involuntarily march with the same cadence, causing resonance. In any case, the oscillation increased. At a time when the bridge was covered with 483 soldiers and four other people (although the police had prevented many curiosity seekers from joining the march), the upstream anchoring cable on the right bank broke in its concrete mooring, three to four meters underground, with a noise like "a badly done volley from a firing squad". The adjacent downstream cable broke a second later, and the right-bank end of the deck fell, making the deck slope very steep and throwing soldiers into the river. Many of those who fell were saved by their fellow soldiers who had not yet crossed and by residents of Angers who came to the rescue, but a total of 226 people died.

The failure was attributed to dynamic load due to the storm and the soldiers, particularly as they seem to have been somewhat in step, combined with corrosion of the anchors for the main cables. The cable anchorages at Angers were found to be highly vulnerable, as they were surrounded by cement, which was believed to rustproof them for the indefinite future. However, the wire strands separated from their cement surrounds. This allowed water to penetrate and corrode the wires.

== Aftermath ==
The disaster led France to abandon suspension bridges until 1870. There had been similar failures elsewhere, such as that at Great Yarmouth in England in May 1845, when 79 people were killed by the fall of the main deck. The fall of the Angers bridge raised serious questions about the integrity of suspension bridges, and some engineers (such as John A. Roebling) used reinforced decks in future structures such as the Brooklyn Bridge. Louis Vicat reported in 1853 on the problems with the anchorages, and all similar bridges in France had to be carefully inspected.

A new bridge was built on the same site in 1960, using reinforced concrete beams.

== Related bridge failures ==
The Angers bridge was not the first suspension bridge to collapse. Previous failures included the Dryburgh Abbey Bridge in 1818 and The Royal Suspension Chain Pier in Brighton in 1836. The Menai Suspension Bridge was damaged by wind in 1825, 1836 and 1839. The Broughton Suspension Bridge had collapsed in 1831 when soldiers marched over it in step. Subsequent spectacular suspension bridge collapses caused by wind include the failure of the Tacoma Narrows Bridge in 1940. However, the Angers bridge failure caused by far the greatest number of casualties.

When the London Thames Millennium Bridge was opened in 2000, the motion of pedestrians caused it to vibrate, and they fell into step with the vibrations, increasing them. This same mechanism may have increased the vibrations of the Angers Bridge. The problem at the Millennium Bridge was corrected during the next two years.
