= Dunkerley's method =

Dunkerley's method is used in mechanical engineering to determine the critical speed of a shaft-rotor system. Other methods include the Rayleigh–Ritz method.

== Whirling of a shaft ==
No shaft can ever be perfectly straight or perfectly balanced. When an element of mass is offset from the axis of rotation, centrifugal force will tend to pull the mass outward. The elastic properties of the shaft will act to restore the “straightness”. If the frequency of rotation is equal to one of the resonant frequencies of the shaft, whirling will occur. In order to save the machine from failure, operation at such whirling speeds must be avoided. Whirling is a complex phenomenon that can include harmonics but we are only going to consider synchronous whirl, where the frequency of whirling is the same as the rotational speed.

== Dunkerley’s formula (approximation) ==
The whirling frequency of a symmetric cross section of a given length between two points is given by:

$$N  = 94.251 \sqrt{E I \over m L^3} \ \text{RPM}$$

where: E = Young's modulus, I = second moment of area, m = mass of the shaft, L = length of the shaft between points.

A shaft with weights added will have an angular velocity of N (RPM) equivalent as follows:

$$\frac{1}{N_N^2} = \frac{1}{N_A^2} + \frac{1}{N_B^2} + \cdots +  \frac{1}{N_n^2}$$

== See also ==
- Vibration
- Mechanical resonance
