= Balancing machine =

Measuring tool used for balancing rotating machine parts

Two balancing masses (denoted m) used to balance a non-concentric rotating mass.

A balancing machine is a measuring tool used for balancing rotating machine parts such as rotors for electric motors, fans, turbines, disc brakes, disc drives, propellers and pumps. The machine usually consists of two rigid pedestals, with suspension and bearings on top supporting a mounting platform. The unit under test is bolted to the platform and is rotated either with a belt-, air-, or end-drive. As the part is rotated, the vibration in the suspension is detected with sensors and that information is used to determine the amount of unbalance in the part. Along with phase information, the machine can determine how much and where to add or remove weights to balance the part.

== Hard-bearing vs. soft-bearing ==
There are two main types of balancing machines, hard-bearing and soft-bearing. The difference between them, however, is in the suspension and not the bearings.

Hard-bearing balancing machines have a rigid suspension, which does not allow for the bearings to move and shift with the weight of the rotor being balanced. Soft-bearing balancing machines have a moveable and loose suspension, allowing their bearings to move with the rotor.

== How it works ==
With the rotating part resting on the bearings, a vibration sensor is attached to the suspension. In most soft-bearing machines, a velocity sensor is used. This sensor works by moving a magnet in relation to a fixed coil that generates voltage proportional to the velocity of the vibration. Accelerometers, which measure acceleration of the vibration, can also be used.

A photocell (sometimes called a phaser), proximity sensor, or encoder is used to determine the rotational speed, as well as the relative phase of the rotating part. This phase information is then used to filter the vibration information to determine the amount of movement, or force, in one rotation of the part. Also, the time difference between the phase and the vibration peak gives the angle at which the unbalance exists. Amount of unbalance and angle of unbalance give an unbalance vector.

Calibration is performed by adding a known weight at a known angle. In a soft-bearing machine, trial weights must be added in correction planes for each part. This is because the location of the correction planes along the rotational axis is unknown, and therefore it is unknown how much a given amount of weight will affect the balance. By using trial weights, a known weight at a known angle is added, and getting the unbalance vector caused by it.

== Other balancing machine types ==
Static balancing machines differ from hard- and soft-bearing machines in that the part is not rotated to take a measurement. Rather than resting on its bearings, the part rests vertically on its geometric center. Once at rest, any movement by the part away from its geometric center is detected by two perpendicular sensors beneath the table and returned as unbalance. Static balancers are often used to balance parts with a diameter much larger than their length, such as fans. The advantages of using a static balancer are speed and price. However a static balancer can only correct in one plane, so its accuracy is limited.

A blade balancing machine attempts to balance a part in assembly, so minimal correction is required later on. Blade mass balancing is typically done for short blades, while long blades may require moment weighing in one or two axes. Long blades that are also wide may require its axial moment to be measured to optimize hub stress distribution. Blade balancers are used on parts such as fans, propellers, and turbines. On a blade balancer, the weight and/or moment of each blade to be assembled is entered into a balancing software package. The software then sorts the blades and attempts to find the blade arrangement with the least amount of unbalance. Lesser amount of unbalance correction weight in the final balancing process means lesser (concentrated) stress to the rotor assembly.

Portable balancing machines are used to balance parts that cannot be taken apart and put on a balancing machine, usually parts that are currently in operation such as turbines, pumps, and motors. Portable balancers come with displacement sensors, such as accelerometers, and a photocell, which are then mounted to the pedestals or enclosure of the running part. Based on the vibrations detected, they calculate the part's unbalance. Many times these devices contain a spectrum analyzer so the part condition can be monitored without the use of a photocell and non-rotational vibration can be analyzed.

== See also ==
- Carl Schenck, German businessman, developer of first Mechanical Balancing Machine.
- Rotordynamics, applied mechanics of rotating structures.
