= Rayleigh's quotient in vibrations analysis =

The Rayleigh quotient represents a quick method to estimate the natural frequency of both discrete and continuous oscillating systems.

$$\omega_n^2 \approx \frac{V}{\tilde{T}}$$

where $\omega_n$ is the natural frequency of the nth mode, $V$ is the potential energy of the system and $\tilde{T}$ is a property equivalent to the kinetic energy but with velocity replaced by position.

== Discrete Systems ==
For multi degree-of-freedom vibration system, in which the mass and the stiffness matrices are known, the Rayleigh quotient can be derived starting from the equation of motion.

The eigenvalue problem for a general system of the form

$$M\,\ddot{\textbf{q}}(t) + C\,\dot{\textbf{q}}(t) + K\,\textbf{q}(t) = \textbf{Q}(t)$$

in absence of damping and external forces reduces to:

$$M\,\ddot{\textbf{q}}(t) + K\,\textbf{q}(t) = 0$$

The previous equation can be written also as the following:

$$K\,\textbf{u} = \omega^2\,M\,\textbf{u}$$

where $\omega$ represents the natural frequency and M and K are the real positive symmetric mass and stiffness matrices respectively.

For an N-degree-of-freedom system the equation has N solutions $\omega_n^2$, $\textbf{u}_n$ for n = 1, 2, 3, ..., N. By multiplying both sides of the equation by $\textbf{u}_n^T$ and dividing by the scalar $\textbf{u}_n^T\,M\,\textbf{u}_n$, it is possible to express the eigenvalue problem as follows:

$$\omega_n^2 = \frac{\textbf{u}_n^T\,K\,\textbf{u}_n}{\textbf{u}_n^T\,M\,\textbf{u}_n}$$

In the previous equation it is also possible to observe that the numerator is proportional to the potential energy while the denominator depicts a measure of the kinetic energy. Moreover, the equation allow us to calculate the natural frequency only if the eigenvector (as well as any other displacement vector) $\textbf{u}_n$ is known. For academic interests, if the modal vectors are not known, we can repeat the foregoing process but with $\omega^2$ and $\textbf{u}$ taking the place of $\omega_n^2$ and $\textbf{u}_n$, respectively. By doing so we obtain the scalar $R(\textbf{u})$, also known as Rayleigh's quotient:

$$R(\textbf{u}) = \omega^2 =  \frac{\textbf{u}^T\,K\,\textbf{u}}{\textbf{u}^T\,M\,\textbf{u}}$$

Therefore, the Rayleigh's quotient is a scalar whose value depends on the vector $\textbf{u}$ and it can be calculated with good approximation for any arbitrary vector $\textbf{u}$ as long as it lays reasonably far from the modal vectors $\textbf{u}_{i} \quad i = 1,2,3,...,N$.

Since, it is possible to state that the vector $\textbf{u}$ differs from the modal vector $\textbf{u}_n$ by a small quantity of first order, the correct result of the Rayleigh's quotient will differ not sensitively from the estimated one and that's what makes this method very useful. A good way to estimate the lowest modal vector $(u_1)$, that generally works well for most structures (even though is not guaranteed), is to assume $(u_1)$ equal to the static displacement from an applied force that has the same relative distribution of the diagonal mass matrix terms. The latter can be elucidated by the following 3-DOF example.

=== Example ===
As an example, we can consider a 3-degree-of-freedom system in which the mass and the stiffness matrices of them are known as follows:
$$M =
\begin{bmatrix}
1 & 0 & 0 \\
0 & 1 & 0 \\
0 & 0 & 3
\end{bmatrix}
\; , \quad
K =
\begin{bmatrix}
3 & -1 & 0 \\
-1 & 3 & -2 \\
0 & -2 & 2
\end{bmatrix}$$

To get an estimation of the lowest natural frequency we choose a trial vector of static displacement obtained by loading the system with a force proportional to the masses:
$$\textbf{F} = k\begin{bmatrix} m_1 \\ m_2 \\ m_3 \end{bmatrix} = 1 \begin{bmatrix} 1 \\ 1 \\ 3 \end{bmatrix}$$

Thus, the trial vector will become
$$\textbf{u} = K^{-1}\textbf{F} = \begin{bmatrix} 2.5 \\ 6.5 \\ 8 \end{bmatrix}$$
that allow us to calculate the Rayleigh quotient:
$$R = \frac{\textbf{u}^T\,K\,\textbf{u}}{\textbf{u}^T\,M\,\textbf{u}} = \cdots = \frac{66}{481} = 0.\overline{137214}$$

Thus, the lowest natural frequency, calculated by means of the Rayleigh quotient is:
$$\omega_\text{Ray} = \frac{\sqrt{31\,746\,}}{481} \approx 0.370424$$

Using a calculation tool is pretty fast to verify how much it differs from the "real" one. In this case, using MATLAB, it has been calculated that the lowest natural frequency is: $\omega_\text{real} = \frac{2}{3} \sqrt{5-2 \sqrt{7} \sin \left(\frac{\pi}{6} + \frac{\pi}{3} \arccos\left(-\frac{11}{32 \sqrt{7}}\right)\right)\,} \approx 0.369308$ (the smalles positive root of the characteristic polynomial $-\omega^6+\frac{20}{3}\omega^4-\frac{32}{3}\omega^2+\frac{4}{3}$) that has led to an error of $0.302315 \%$ using the Rayleigh's approximation, a remarkable result.

The example shows how the Rayleigh quotient is capable of getting an accurate estimation of the lowest natural frequency. The practice of using the static displacement vector as a trial vector is valid as the static displacement vector tends to resemble the lowest vibration mode.

== Continuous systems ==
For continuous systems, the concept of mass and stiffness matrices does not apply, but it can be seen that the Rayleigh quotient is still the ratio of the potential energy to the "kinetic energy without the time derivatives":

$$R = \omega^2 = \frac{V}{\tilde{T}}$$

The arises for the concept of the maximum kinetic energy being equal to the maximum potential energy for conservative systems For the case of a string of mass per unit length m under tension P:

$\tilde{T} = \frac{1}{2}m\int y^2\, dx \quad$ and $\quad V = \frac{1}{2}P\int \left(\frac{\partial y}{\partial x}\right)^2\, dx$

== See also ==
- Rayleigh's quotient
- Rayleigh quotient iteration
- Eigenvalue algorithm
- Generalized eigenvalue problem
