= Heave compensation =

Motion compensation on the vertical axis

Heave compensation is motion compensator technology applied to minimizing the vertical movement of a load supported by lifting gear mounted on a heaving platform. Techniques include active heave compensation and passive heave compensation—the two traditional types of heave compensation—as well as balanced heave compensation. Devices that perform heave compensation are known as heave compensators.

== Description ==
Heave compensation is move compensator technology used to minimize the movement of a load in one direction. This direction is often vertical, as for a load supported by lifting gear mounted on a heaving platform. In offshore drilling, heave compensation is used to reduce the impact on the drill system from motions, including those of waves and the vessel.

== Types ==
There are two traditional basic types of heave compensation are active heave compensation and passive heave compensation. Balanced heave compensation is also used, and differs from the two traditional approaches.

=== Active heave compensation ===
Active heave compensation has a control system that uses power to drive the lifting gear to keep the load stabilized along the vertical axis to compensate for any movement of the platform specific point, using power to gain positional accuracy.

=== Passive heave compensation ===
Passive heave compensation uses a relatively soft spring which isolates the load from most of the vertical force variation to reduce transmissibility of transient loads.

=== Adaptive passive heave compensation ===
Adaptive passive heave compensation is an improvement to passive heave compensation, that allows stiffness and damping to be adjusted during usage. It is particularly useful when doing a lifting operation that starts topside and moves through the splash zone, through potential resonance and finally landing at deep waters.

=== Balanced heave compensation ===
Balanced heave compensation converts the non-linear force of a gas spring or hydro-pneumatic spring into an adjustable, substantially linear force supporting the load.

=== Crane shock absorbers ===
Crane shock absorbers are low cost compensation devices that are used to mitigate dynamic shocks that can occur for example during pile hammering. Incidents offshore have caused significant damage to both cranes and equipment when no shock absorber was present.

== Compensators ==
A heave compensator is a kind of motion compensator. Whereas most motion compensators will compensate for movement in all directions, the heave compensator will compensate for movement in only one direction, for instance, for vertical movement. In practice, the words motion compensator and heave compensator are used interchangeably. Sensor technologies being used are inertial sensors and GNSS (example: iMAR Navigation) or image processing.

The simplest motion compensator is the anchor chain of a ship. Not only does the anchor prevent the ship from drifting, but the chain itself dampens the movement of the ship due to undulating motion of the waves. Generally, motion compensators are implemented as springs. For very large forces (dozens to hundreds of tonnes), the springs are implemented as gas springs: hydropneumatic devices — a plunger cylinder buffered by a volume of gas.

Examples of heave compensators include:

- Drill string compensators
- Riser tensioners
- Conductor tensioners
- Guideline tensioners

More advanced heave compensated systems are often specified as systems with passive heave compensation or active heave compensation or combinations of these. A new approach to advanced heave compensation systems is offered by balanced heave compensation, increasing safety while lowering energy consumption and spring adjustment times.
