= Balanced heave compensation =

Motion-compensation technology

Balanced heave compensation (BHC) is a heave compensation technology engaging the principle of a balanced-arm lamp for offshore motion compensation.

== Working principle ==
The technical working principle can be summarized as converting the non-linear force of a gas spring or hydro-pneumatic spring into an adjustable, substantially linear force, by several mechanical measures. The technology comprises a series of patented inventions by NHLO licensed to and marketed by Seaqualize.

An active balanced heave compensation (ABHC) system adds an active component to a BHC for even further stabilisation of the mass.

== Research project ==
In cooperation with IHC and research partners MARIN and ECN, a scale model of a first device comprising the technology, an offshore access bridge has been tested. Seaqualize is currently working on a full-scale prototype of the access bridge. The project has been subsidized by the Dutch Ministry of Economic Affairs as a renewable energy project. The research project indicates balanced heave compensation enables a range of potential benefits compared to currently available solutions. This may lead to improvements and cost savings in (engaging) heave compensation systems.

== Comparison to traditional heave compensation systems ==
Balanced heave compensation (BHC) differs from traditional (spring-based) passive heave compensation (PHC) and active heave compensation (AHC) in several ways.

In traditional spring based heave compensation systems, the movement of the mass is parallel to the movement of the spring cylinder. A passive heave compensation system is in effect a mass spring system: it stabilizes a certain mass in a single position of the spring, in that position only the spring and the mass are balanced. In other positions of the spring, the mass and the spring are not balanced and the mass will tend to start moving towards the stabilized position due to residual forces in the spring.

A mass spring system can be beneficial for heave compensation only in certain (preset) conditions: the spring, its excitation, the mass and the frequency of the excitation of the spring all need to be taken into account in order for a mass to be substantially stabilised in a moving environment. In other (unexpected) conditions, mass spring systems may experience unwanted effects such as load amplification: its mass may start to move viciously instead of being stabilised. An active heave compensation system adds an active component to a traditional passive heave compensation system in order to counteract these residual forces / in order to counteract load amplification, in effect minimising the movement of the load.

In BHC systems, the movement of the mass is not parallel to the movement of the spring, leading to significantly lower residual forces, and therefore lower requirements on the active components. In BHC systems, load amplification is unlikely to occur since the mass is substantially balanced in the whole range of movement of the spring. Residual forces are minimized and therefore unexpected conditions such as variations in the wave pattern have a negligible effect on the working principle. This leads to a better stabilisation of the mass compared to PHC systems.
