= Polymeric foam =

Foam formed from polymers

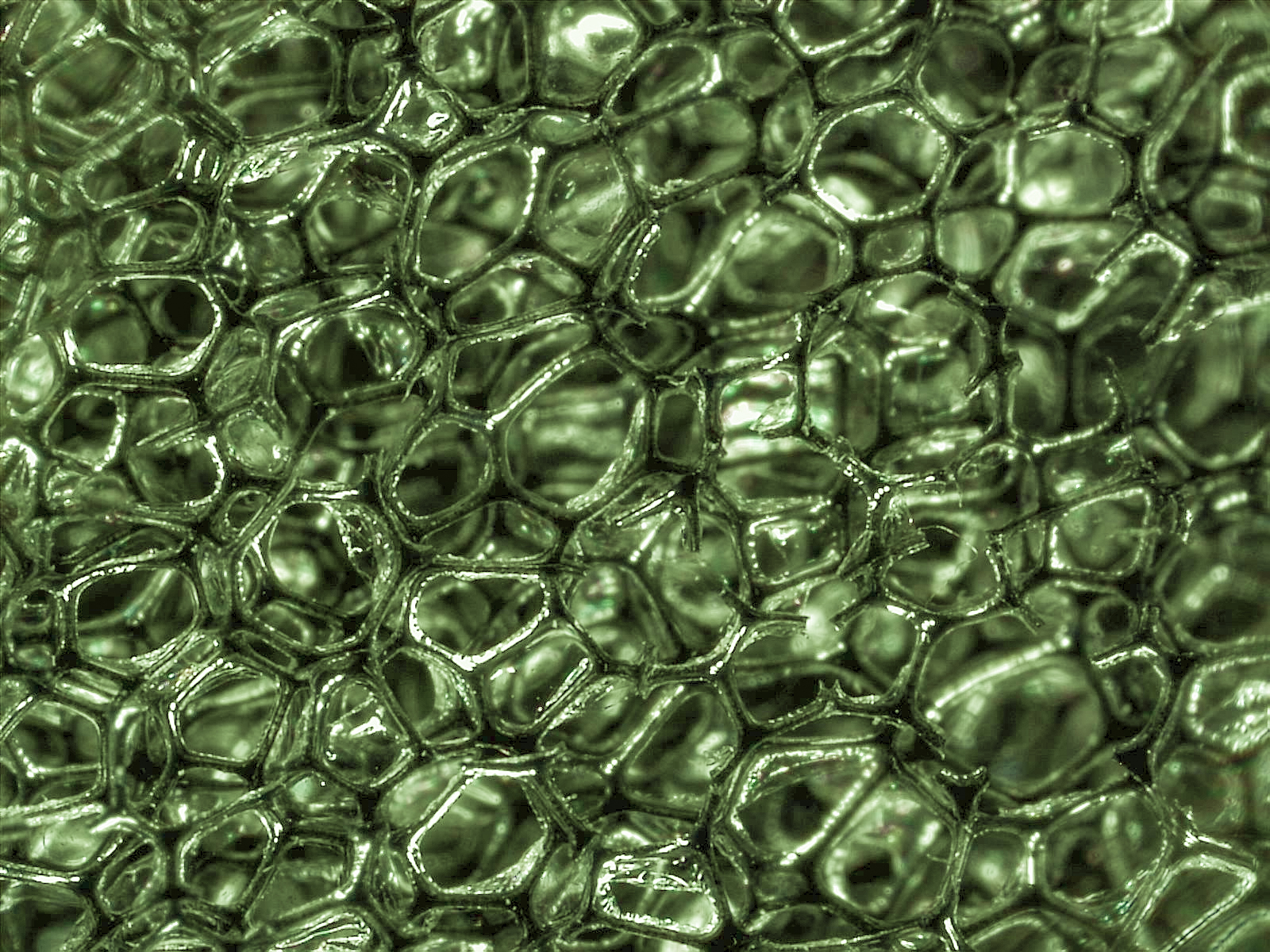
Solid polymeric foam for packaging under the optical microscope.

A polymeric foam is a special foam, in liquid or solidified form, formed from polymers.

Examples include:

- Ethylene-vinyl acetate (EVA) foam, the copolymers of ethylene and vinyl acetate; also referred to as polyethylene-vinyl acetate (PEVA)
- Low-density polyethylene (LDPE) foam, first grade of polyethylene (PE)
- Nitrile rubber (NBR) foam, the copolymers of acrylonitrile (ACN) and butadiene
- Polychloroprene foam or Neoprene
- Polyimide foam
- Polypropylene (PP) foam, including expanded polypropylene (EPP) and polypropylene paper (PPP)
- Polystyrene#Foams (PS) foam
  - Expanded polystyrene (EPS)
  - Extruded polystyrene foam (XPS), sometimes sold under brand name Styrofoam
  - sometimes polystyrene paper (PSP)
- Polyurethane (PU) foam
  - LRPu low-resilience polyurethane
  - Memory foam
  - Sorbothane
- Polyurea foam
- Polyethylene foam, as used in PEF rod
- Polyvinyl chloride (PVC) foam
  - Closed-cell PVC foamboard
- Silicone foam
- Microcellular foam

== See also ==
- Ultralight material
