= ILD =

ILD may refer to:

== Organizations ==
- Independent Lutheran Diocese a small Confessional Lutheran Association in the United States.
- International Liaison Department of the Chinese Communist Party, a minister-level department of the Chinese government
- Institute for Liberty and Democracy, a think tank in Lima, Peru
- International Labor Defense (1925–1946), a legal defense organization of the Communist Party USA

== Science and technology ==
- Interaural level difference (or interaural intensity difference), a sound property that allows spatial localization of the sound source
- Interstitial lung disease, a group of lung diseases that affect tissue between the airways
- Injection Laser Diode, a type of semiconductor laser used in optical networks

== Miscellaneous ==
- Internet Listing Display, a set of rules put forth by the National Association of Realtors (USA) that regulate how homes and properties can be displayed on internet sites
- Indentation load-deflection, an alternate term for Indentation force-deflection, a process for grading the firmness of rubber foams
- Information-led development, a development strategy focusing on a national information technology sector

=== Codes ===
- the IATA airport designator of Lleida–Alguaire Airport, Alguaire, Catalonia, Spain.
