= Polyurethane foam =

Material used for thermal insulation

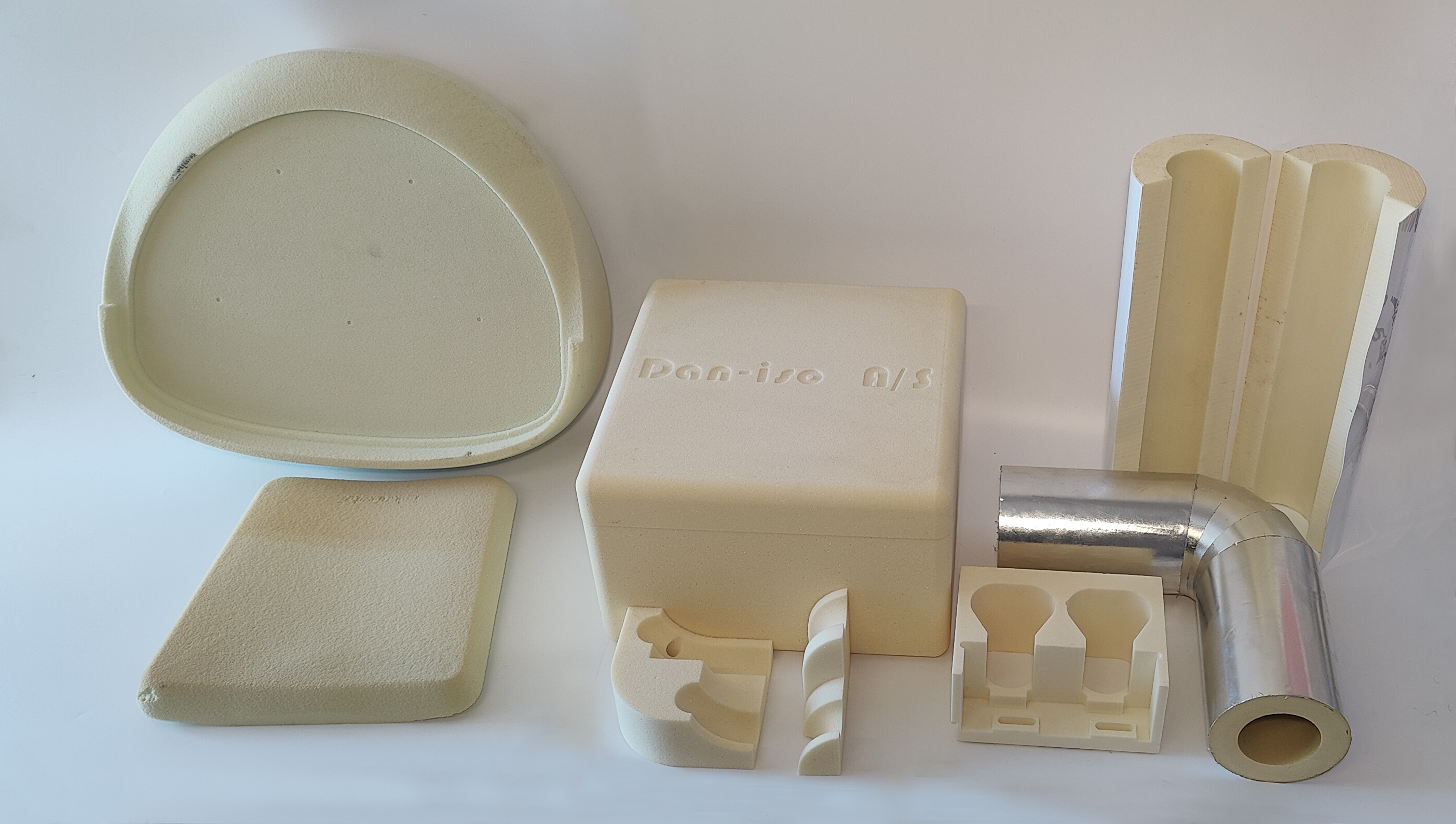
An assortment of polyurethane foam products for cushioning and insulation

Polyurethane foam is a solid polymeric foam based on polyurethane chemistry. As a specialist synthetic material with highly diverse applications, polyurethane foams are primarily used for thermal insulation and as a cushioning material in mattresses, upholstered furniture or as seating in vehicles. Its low density and thermal conductivity combined with its mechanical properties make them excellent thermal and sound insulators, as well as structural and comfort materials.

Polyurethane foams are thermosetting polymers. They cannot be melted and reshaped after initially formed, because the chemical bonds between the molecules in the material are very strong and are not broken down by heating. Once cured and cooled, the material maintains its shape and properties.

== Classification of polyurethane foams ==
Polyurethane foams are the most widely used representatives of thermoset foams. Depending on their cellular structure, they can be classified as open or closed-cell foams. Looking at mechanical properties, there are two main types of polyurethane foam: flexible (soft) and rigid (hard) foams. Generally speaking, flexible polyurethane foams have an open-cell structure where the pores are interconnected, smaller in size and irregularly shaped. Rigid polyurethane foams have a closed-cell structure, where the pores are not interconnected. The market share between these two types is largely equal.

There are various processing technologies in the production of polyurethane foams. Depending on the properties of the end application, the two most often used at large scale production are moulding and slabstock (block) foaming. Next to these, other prominent types include cavity-filling foam (e.g. car fillings used for acoustic insulation); and spray foam (e.g. roof thermal insulation). These are known as semi-flexible foams behind appropriate overlays.

== Flexible polyurethane foam ==
The flexible polyurethane foam (FPUF) is produced from the reaction of polyols and isocyanates, a process pioneered in 1937. Depending on the application the foam will be used for, a series of additives are necessary to produce high-quality PU foam products. FPUF is a versatile material that can be tailored to exhibit different properties. It allows for superior compression, load-bearing and resilience that provides a cushioning effect. Because of this property, lightweightness, and efficient production process, it is often used in furniture, bedding, automotive seating, athletic equipment, packaging, footwear, and carpets.

Flexible polyurethane foams with a high volume of open pores have been greatly regarded as an effective noise absorption material and are widely used as acoustic insulation in various sectors, from construction to transportation. It is also a very resilient material that does not deteriorate over time and its lifetime is typically linked to the lifetime of the application it is used in.

=== Types of flexible polyurethane foams based on manufacturing technology ===
Flexible polyurethane foams can be manufactured through a continuous (slabstock) production or moulding process. In the continuous process, the mixed ingredients are poured on the conveyor belt. The chemical reaction occurs instantly, causing the foam to rise within seconds and then solidify. In theory, foam blocks of several kilometres in length could be produced this way. In reality, the foam blocks are typically cut at a length of between 15 and 120m, cured and stored for further processing.

Contrary to slabstock foam, moulded foam production is a discontinuous process. Moulded foam articles are made one at a time by injecting the foam mixture into moulds. When the foam rises and expands, it occupies the whole space in the mould. It solidifies almost instantly and the produced part can then be removed from the mould, either mechanically or manually. This is the biggest advantage of moulded PU foams – they can be moulded into specific desired shapes, eliminating the need for cutting and reducing waste fractions. They can be produced with multiple zones of hardness and with reinforcements for further easier assembly. This is why moulded foam technology is widely used in the production of seat cushions used in the transport industries.

Based on the production process, other types of flexible polyurethane foams may include rebonded (or recycled), reticulated and auxetic PU foams.

=== Sustainability of flexible polyurethane foams ===
Since the invention of polyurethane chemistry there have been constant innovations in the industry, driven by the need to decrease the toxicity of chemical substances used in production processes. Some examples include reducing Volatile Organic Compounds emissions or using blowing agents with a lower global warming potential (GWP) as well as ozone-depleting potential (ODP).

In the last decades, the main focus of the FPUF industry has been improving the environmental impact of its products and processes. A cradle-to-gate analysis of flexible (TDI slabstock) PU foam shows that (by far) the largest effect on the life cycle of the PU foams is due to raw materials extraction and production. Depending on the parameters, these account for about 90% of the total Greenhouse Gas (GHG) emissions.

Traditionally nearly all raw materials used for flexible PU foam production have been of fossil origin. Today, it is possible to make flexible PU foams from alternative, non-fossil sources, thus significantly improving its environmental footprint. These include bio-polyols, recycled polyols and CO_{2}-based polyols.

As a thermosetting polymer PU foam cannot just be melted at the end of its useful life to make new products. For PU foam-containing products, there are various recycling technologies available and in broad use today:

1. Physical (or mechanical) recycling. Physical recycling changes the physical properties of the material to a form more suitable for further processing. With this recycling process, the chemical composition of the PU material is not changed. The most common method is called rebonding, in which the flexible PU foam (production cut-offs and end-of-life foam) is transformed into so-called trim (foam flocks), which in turn can become rebonded foam used in products such as: e.g. carpet underlay, gym mats, acoustic insulation, as well as mattresses and furniture cushioning. Other types of mechanical recycling of PU foam include regrinding (powdering), compression moulding and adhesive pressing of powdered PU waste. For example, regrinding includes shredding PU material into a fine powder and mixing it as filler with a polyol component to make new PU foams
2. Chemical recycling (or depolymerisation). Chemical recycling methods are focused on recovering monomers, which can be used to synthesise new polymers. The chemical composition of the waste PU foam is changed by breaking down and reforming the targeted bonds, to recover the original raw materials. Flexible polyurethane foam is broken down into its specific constituent chemical raw materials, which can be used again to make fresh foam. Technology has been in use at an industrial scale (in Europe) since 2013 for post-industrial flexible PU foam. Differentiated by the base material used to dissolve PU foam, depolymerisation technologies include hydrolysis, aminolysis, alcoholysis and glycolysis.
3. Feedstock (or thermo-chemical) recovery. Feedstock recycling includes thermal processing of (often) mixed waste materials (of which PU can be one constituent), disintegrating them at a molecular level and recovering synthesis (syngas) and fuel gas - products which can be further used as new raw materials for the petrochemical industry. Mass balance accounting is needed to account for recycled materials. For applications that are too difficult to dismantle or too contaminated to recycle, thermo-chemical recycling is the best option. This technology in particular allows the production of new “virgin-equivalent” raw materials, which are specifically appropriate for the production of applications that need to comply with stringent requirements, e.g. in the automotive industry.

Globally today the most often used waste management methods are landfilling and energy recovery. These should only be used when recycling methods are not available or cost-effective. Energy recovery processes include combustion, incineration and thermal degradation of PU.

== Rigid polyurethane foams ==
Rigid polyurethane foam has many desirable properties which has enabled increased use in various applications, some of which are quite demanding. These properties include low thermal conduction making it useful as an insulator. It also has low density compared to metals and other materials and also good dimensional stability. A metal will expand on heating whereas rigid PU foam does not. They have excellent strength to weight ratios. Like many applications, there has been a trend to make rigid PU foam from renewable raw materials in place of the usual polyols.

They are used in vehicles, planes and buildings in structural applications. They have also been used in fire-retardant applications.

== Space shuttles ==
Polyurethane foam has been widely used to insulate fuel tanks on Space Shuttles. However, it requires a perfect application, as any air pocket, dirt or an uncovered tiny spot can knock it off due to extreme conditions of liftoff. Those conditions include violent vibrations, air friction and abrupt changes in temperature and pressure. For a perfect application of the foam there have been two obstacles: limitations related to wearing protective suits and masks by workers and inability to test for cracks before launch, such testing is done only by naked eye. The loss of foam caused the Space Shuttle Columbia disaster. According to the Columbia accident report, NASA officials found foam loss in over 80% of the 79 missions for which they have pictures.

By 2009 researchers created a superior polyimide foam to insulate the reusable cryogenic propellant tanks of Space Shuttles.

== See also ==
- Acoustic foam
