= Transmissibility (vibration) =

Mechanical and acoustical property

In mechanics and acoustics, transmissibility describes how dynamic motion, force, or energy is transmitted through a mechanical system from one location to another.

Traditionally, transmissibility was defined in the context of vibration isolation as the ratio of a response amplitude or transmitted force to an imposed excitation, particularly for single-degree-of-freedom systems. This classical definition remains fundamental in the design of vibration isolators and support systems.

For more complex systems, including multi-degree-of-freedom systems and elastic continua such as beams and plates, the concept has been generalized to describe frequency-dependent relationships between responses at different locations or between sets of dynamic variables. Under these generalized formulations, transmissibility may be represented by response ratios, transmissibility functions, or transmissibility matrices that characterize vibration transmission throughout a structure.

Transmissibility: $T = \frac{\text{output}}{\text{input}}$

$T>1$ means amplification and maximum amplification occurs when forcing frequency ($f_f$) and natural frequency ($f_n$) of the system coincide.

There is no unit designation for transmissibility, although it may sometimes be referred to as the Q factor.

The transmissibility is used in calculation of passive heave compensation efficiency.

The lesser the transmissibility the better is the damping or the isolation system.

$T<1$ is Desirable, $T=1$ acts as a rigid body, $T>1$ is Undesirable

== See also ==
- Q factor
