= Motion compensator =

A motion compensator is a device that decreases the undesirable effects of the relative motion between two connected objects.

== Description ==
A motion compensator is a device that decreases the undesirable effects of the relative motion between two connected objects. The motion compensator does not prevent the motion, but tries to eliminate the negative effects of the movement. These negative effects include (1) the changes in force and stresses, and (2) the hysteresis, i.e., the rapid start-and-stop "jerking" of the objects.

Motion compensators are usually placed between a floating object and a more stationary object, such as a vessel or a structure fixed to the seabed. Most general motion compensators will compensate for movement in all directions

The simplest motion compensator is the anchor chain of a ship. Not only does the anchor prevent the ship from drifting, but the chain itself dampens the movement of the ship due to undulating motion of the waves. Generally, motion compensators are implemented as springs. For very large forces (dozens to hundreds of tonnes), the springs are implemented as gas springs: hydropneumatic devices — a plunger cylinder buffered by a volume of gas.

== Heave compensation ==
A heave compensator is a kind of motion compensator that compensates for movement in only one direction.

=== Examples ===
Examples of heave compensators include:

- Drill string compensators, typically used in the offshore oil and gas industry
- Riser tensioners
- a heavy compensator on crane vessels
- Conductor tensioners
- Guideline tensioners

== See also ==
- Heave compensation
