= Offshore crane shock absorber =

An offshore crane shock absorber is a gas spring with hydraulic damping used to reduce dynamic loads during offshore lifting. The lifting capacity of the offshore crane can be increased significantly during lifting in high sea states if a shock absorber is fitted.

== Crane design load ==
Offshore lifting capacity is governed by classification society rules. The fundamental rule is that the design load should not be exceeded. The design load is given by:
$F_m= \psi m_s g$

Where:
$F_m$ - Crane design load
$\psi$ - Dynamic coefficient
$m_s$ - Safe working load
$g$ - Acceleration of gravity

The classification societies require that $\psi$ ≥1.3 for offshore cranes. This means that $m_s$ cannot exceed $\frac {F_m}{\psi g}$ even for platform lifts.

== Dynamic load ==
To calculate the dynamic load the classification societies use energy equations. The kinetic energy of the load is expressed as:
$E_k=\frac {1}{2} m_s v_r^2$, or alternatively as potential energy $E_p=m_sgh$.

Where:
$E_k$ - Kinetic energy of the load
$v_r$ - Relative velocity between crane hook and load

$h$ - Free fall distance of payload (typically due to slack slings)

Energy absorbed by the crane is given by:
$E_c=\frac {1}{2} k y^2$

Where:
$E_c$ - Spring energy stored in crane structure
$k$ - Stiffness of offshore crane
$y$ - Vertical displacement of crane hook

The spring force is given by:
$F_c=ky$

Combining the two previous equations yields an alternative description of the energy stored in the crane structure:
$E_c=\frac {1}{2}k (\frac {F_c}{k})^2=\frac {F_c^2}{2k}$

During an offshore lift the crane does not start to absorb energy from the load before the force in the crane wire exceeds the static weight of the load, which means that we can write the energy absorption of the crane as:
$E_c=\frac {(m_s \psi g-m_s g)^2}{2k}$

Setting $E_c$ equal to $E_k$: $\frac {(m_s \psi g-m_s g)^2}{2k}=\frac {1}{2} m_s v_r^2$

And solving for $\psi$:
$\psi= 1+\frac {v_r}{g}\sqrt{\frac {k}{m}}$

The dynamic factor will always be larger than 1 because there will always be a velocity difference between the crane hook and the load during offshore lifts. The value of $\psi$ determines the lifting capacity as a function of $v_r$ which is dependent on the significant wave height. If the offshore crane has a shock absorber mounted it will absorb energy according to:
$E_a=\eta \mu S m_s g (\psi -1)$

Where:
$E_a$ - Energy absorbed by shock absorber
$\mu$ - Stroke utilization (safety factor), standard value 0.9
$\eta$ - Efficiency of shock absorber, typically 0.5 to 0.7 and depending on payload speed, and 0.9 and beyond for pure shock absorbers
$S$ - Stroke length

Adding this to the energy balance yields:

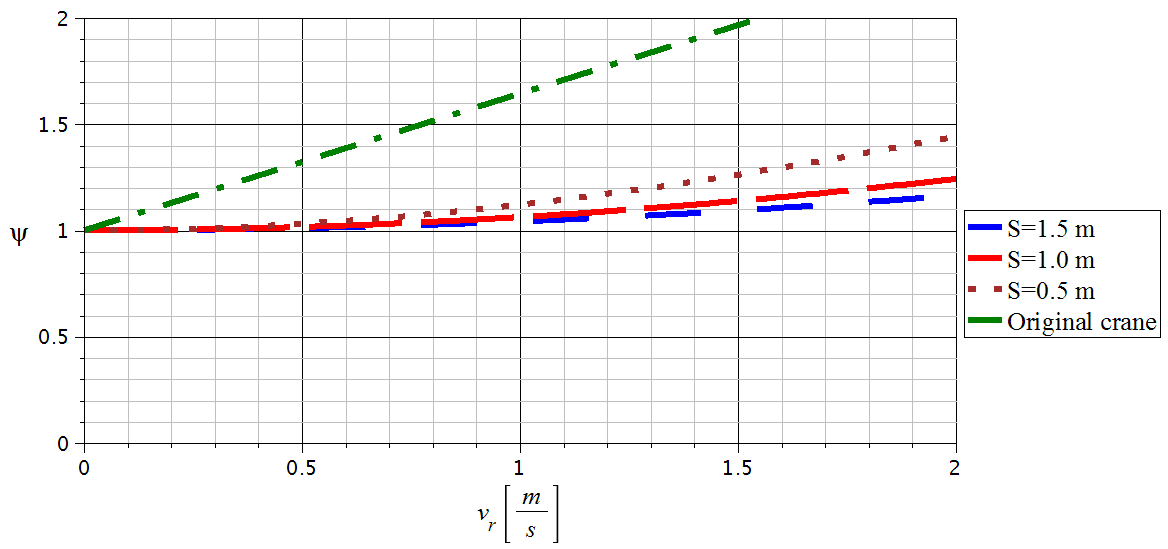
Dynamic coefficient versus relative velocity

$\frac {(m_s \psi g-m_s g)^2}{2k}+\eta \mu S m_s g (\psi -1)=\frac {1}{2} m_s v_r^2$

Again solving for ψ:
$\psi=1+ \frac {\sqrt{(\mu \eta S k)^2+m_s k v_r^2}-\mu \eta S k} {m_s g}$

The plot to the right shows the effect of the shock absorber stroke length.

== Estimating relative velocity ==
The relative velocity is defined by several classification societies as:
$v_r=\frac {1} {2} v_L + \sqrt{v_d^2 + v_c^2}$

Where:
$v_L$ - Maximum crane lifting velocity at this SWL
$v_d$ - Vertical velocity of the deck which the load is placed on
$v_c$ - Vertical velocity of the crane tip due to wave motion

$v_L$ has to be gathered from crane user manual or be measured. The deck velocity can be estimated from Table 1.

Table 1: Deck velocity estimation
| Lifting from or to | $v_d$ |
|---|---|
| Platform or fixed structure | $0$ |
| Supply boat or barge | $0.6 H_s$ if $H_s$ ≤3 $1.8 + 0.3(H_s-3)$ if $H_s$>3 |

The crane tip velocity, $v_c$, can be estimated by Table 2.

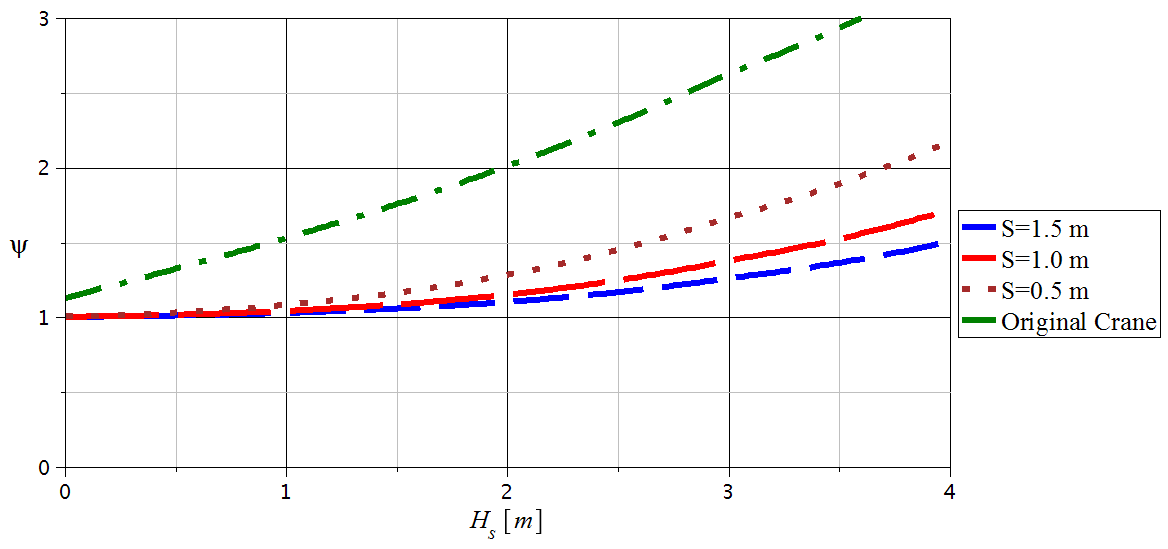
Dynamic factor versus significant wave height

Table 2: Crane tip velocity
| Lifting from or to | $v_d$ |
|---|---|
| Platform or fixed structure | $0$ |
| Tension leg platform or Spar | $0.05 H_s$ |
| Semisubmersible | $0.082 H_s^2$ |
| FPSO or drillship | $0.164 H_s^2$ |

These estimations are conservative and for large ships/rigs they may deviate significantly from reality. A plot of the dynamic factor versus significant wave height for a crane mounted on a semisubmersible and lifting from supply boat is shown above to the right.

== Energy balance ==
The energy balance shown below is a useful visual aid to understand the workings of the shock absorber.

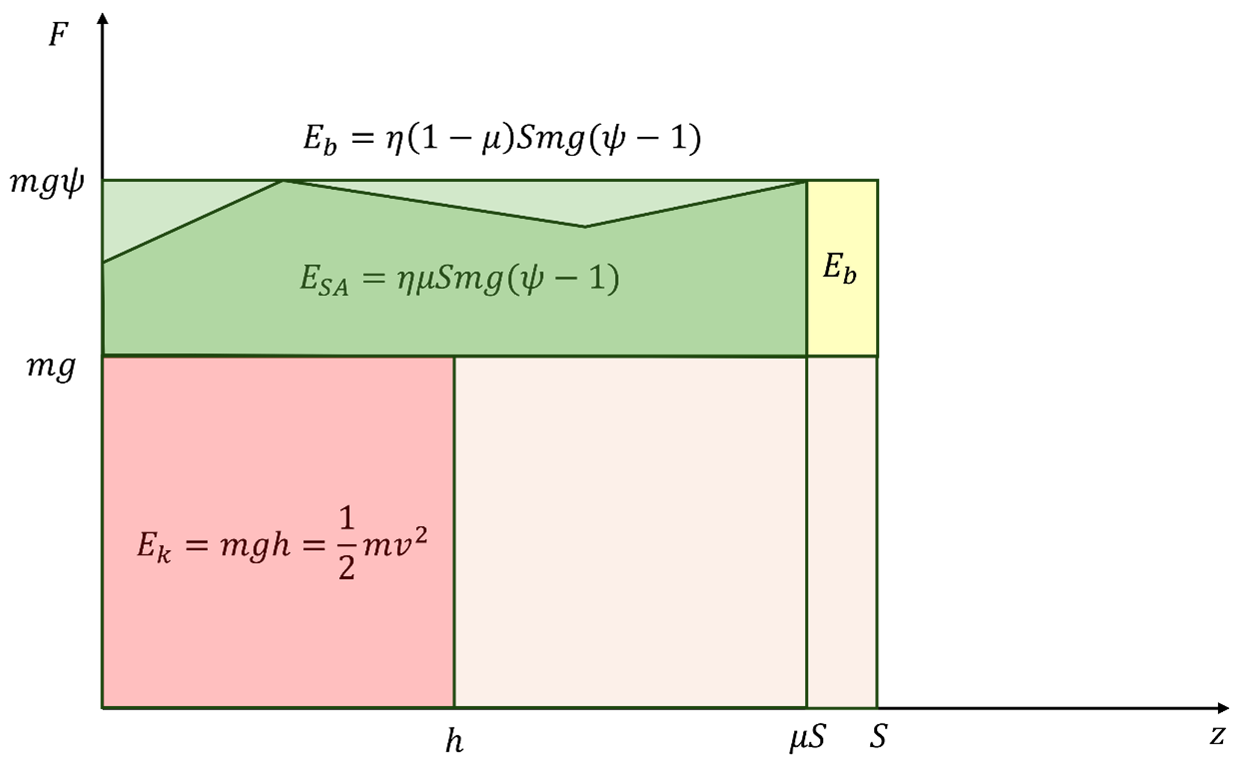
Energy balance between falling payload and shock absorber

The shock absorber can only reduce the kinetic energy of the payload whilst the force acting upon the payload from the shock absorber is larger than the force of gravity (i.e. $mg$) .

$\psi$ is the peak dynamic amplification factor exerted by the shock absorber, the peak force from the shock absorber is hence $\psi mg$.

The efficiency $\eta$ is the ratio of the dark green area to the sum of the dark and light green area. The closer the value of $\eta$ is to 1 the less stroke is required to absorb the kinetic energy.

The yellow area is the energy that can be absorbed if the stroke was fully utilized. $\mu$ is hence a safety factor that is used to have some spare absorption capacity available, with a recommended minimum value of 0.9.
