= LRPu =

LRPu or low-resilience polyurethane is a material distinguished by an "ability to slowly return to its original shape".

The resulting impact resistance results in LRPu being used in soft laptop sleeves and other lightweight cases for portable electronic equipment, as an alternative to the softer neoprene.

== See also ==
- Neoprene
- Polyurethane
- Memory foam
- Sorbothane
