= Guideline tensioner =

Hydropneumatic drilling device

A guideline tensioner is a hydropneumatic device used on an offshore drilling rig that keeps a positive pulling force on the guidelines from the platform to a template on the seabed.

The guidelines act as a guidance for equipment and tools that must be lowered to the template. If there was no tensioner and the platform moved, the guidelines would become slack and could be broken. For this reason a number of guideline tensioners are mounted between the platform and riser. Each of these guideline tensioners consists of a hydraulic cylinder with sheaves at both sides. The cylinder is connected to one or more high pressure gas bottles via a medium separator. A wire rope is rigged in the cylinder; one end is connected to the fixed part of the tensioner, the other end to the template.

== See also ==
- Drill string compensator
- Riser tensioner
- Hydraulic jigger
