= Recoil buffer =

A recoil buffer is a factory-installed or aftermarket component of firearms which serves to reduce the velocity and/or cushion the impact of recoiling parts of a firearm.

== Design ==
The simplest form of recoil buffer is made from a resilient and deformable material (leather, rubber, polymer e.g. a rubber butt pad on a shotgun). A second way of producing a recoil buffer is to insert a spring into the recoil train—the path/part(s) generating recoil impulse. This spring is mounted to the point(s) where the firearm contacts a mechanical holder such as a tripod or human upper torso. Reducing the initial jolt, the rate and/or extent of rearward displacement, and any internal impacts in the operating parts of a firearm can reduce the shooter's perception of recoil, and may also work to extend the life of the mechanism and its parts. More sophisticated designs use hydraulic or pneumatic shock absorbers; systems of springs, cams and levers to modify, dampen, or dissipate the rearward impulse generated as the projectile is fired down the bore of the firearm. Aftermarket buffers are often moulded bumpers or additional springs placed between operating metal parts which impact one another, such as the slide and the frame of a semi-automatic pistol. This type of buffer cushions the battering force of repeated metal on metal impact, reducing wear on parts and lengthening the service life of the firearm. Reduction of perceived recoil discomfort is an immediate added benefit of this type of recoil buffer.

Some pneumatic recoil buffers used in firearms are fast, low-power gas springs. When compressed, they present initial resistance as the rod-to-seal grip is broken and then they move in a regular manner. An additional small spring can be used inside the gas spring if rapid turnaround times are needed. Coil-type springs twist and the coils try to ride over each other when moving and this chaotic movement does not exist with gas springs, hence reducing twist and jump of the firearm. These features are very advantageous. Fine tuning of the spring power is also possible by altering the internal gas volume. This design for firearms was invented and patented by Collins and Shipman of Bedford, UK and Bergstrom in the U.S. in 2001.

== Controversy ==
There is some debate as to whether or not buffers really reduce recoil, with some arguing they actually increase it and, in addition, cause malfunctions of the firearm. This debate mainly occurs with guns that weren't originally designed for recoil buffers, such as the M1911 and AK-47, but has also extended to designs that included them originally. The counter argument generally is that if the buffer is made out of proper materials, it can absorb the recoil instead of transferring it, and that most malfunctions are caused by cheap plastic buffers.

== See also ==
- Glossary of firearms terms
- Firearm components
- Firearm terminology
- Glossary of military abbreviations
- List of established military terms
