= Passive heave compensation =

Technique used to reduce the influence of waves upon lifting and drilling operations

Passive heave compensation is a technique used to reduce the influence of waves upon lifting and drilling operations. A simple passive heave compensator (PHC) is a soft spring which utilizes spring isolation to reduce transmissibility to less than 1. PHC differs from AHC by not consuming external power.

== Principle ==
The main principle in PHC is to store the energy from the external forces (waves) influencing the system and dissipate them or reapply them later. Shock absorbers or drill string compensators are simple forms of PHC, so simple that they are normally named heave compensators, while "passive" is used about more sophisticated hydraulic or mechanical systems.

A typical PHC device consists of a hydraulic cylinder and a gas accumulator. When the piston rod extends it will reduce the total gas volume and hence compress the gas that in turn increases the pressure acting upon the piston. The compression ratio is low to ensure low stiffness. A well designed PHC device can achieve efficiencies above 80 percent, and in some cases above 90%, especially if the submerged weight is low compared to the weight in air.

== Application ==
PHC is often used on offshore equipment that is at or linked to the seabed. Not requiring external energy, PHC may be designed as a fail-safe system reducing the wave impact on sub-sea operations. PHC may be used along with active heave compensation to form a semi-active system.

== Calculation of PHC ==
=== Efficiency for a PHC used during offshore lifting operations ===
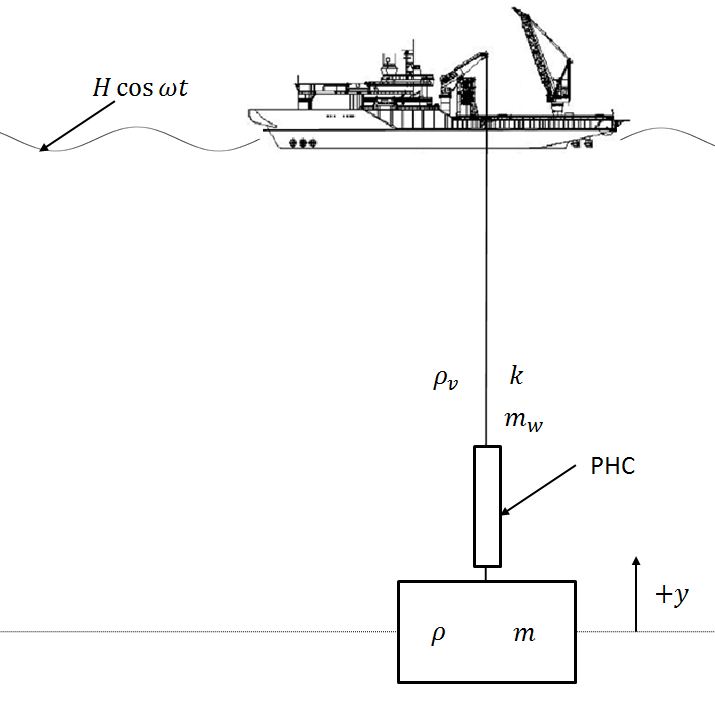
Sketch of system

The PHC device is in this calculation connected to the crane hook. Newton's second law is used to describe the acceleration of the payload:

$$(m+m_A) \ddot y =-k_c(y+H \cos \omega t)$$

Where

$m$ - is the mass of the load underneath the PHC device
$m_A$ - is the added mass of the load underneath the PHC device
$\ddot y$ - is the acceleration of the mass of the load underneath the PHC device
$k_c$ - is the stiffness of the PHC device
$y$ - is the vertical position of the mass underneath the PHC device
$H$ - is the vessel motion amplitude
$\omega$ - is the angular wave frequency
$t$ - is time

Ignoring the transient solution, it is found that the ratio between the amplitude of the load and the wave amplitude is:

$$\frac {A}{H} = \frac{ \frac {k_c}{m+m_A}} { \omega^2 - \frac {k_c}{m+m_A}}$$

To simplify the expression, it is common to introduce $\omega _0$ as the system's natural frequency, defined as:

$$\omega _0 = \sqrt {\frac {k_c}{m+m_A}}$$

This leads to the following expression for the ratio:

$$\frac {A}{H} = \frac {1}{({\frac {\omega}{\omega_0}})^2-1}$$

The transmissibility $T_R$ is defined as:

$$T_R= \left | \frac {1}{({\frac {\omega}{\omega_0}})^2-1}  \right |$$

Finally, the efficiency is defined as:

$$\eta_{PHC}= 1-T_R$$

=== Calculating PHC stiffness ===
The stiffness of a PHC device is given by:

$$k_c= \frac {p_0 A}{S}(C^\kappa-1)$$

Where

$p_0$ - is the gas pressure at equilibrium stroke
$A$ - is the piston area
$S$ - is the stroke length
$C$ - is the compression ratio
$\kappa$ - is the adiabatic coefficient

The product $p_0 A$ corresponds to the submerged weight of the payload. As can be seen from the expression, low compression ratios and long stroke length give low stiffness.

=== Natural period of a PHC ===
The natural period of a PHC is given by:

$T_n = \pi \sqrt{ \frac{m + m_A}{m} \, \frac{\rho}{\rho - \rho_w} \, \frac{2S}{ g\!\left(\left(\frac{R - 0.5}{R - 1}\right)^{\gamma} - 1\right) } }$

Where

$S$ - is the stroke length
$m$ - is the payload mass
$m_A$ - is the hydrodynamic added mass
$\rho$ - is the mass density of the payload
$\rho_w$ - is the mass density of the seawater
$g$ - is the acceleration of gravity
$R$ - is the gas to oil ratio
$\gamma$ - is the adiabatic exponent
