= Memory foam =

Component primarily utilized for making cushions or mattresses

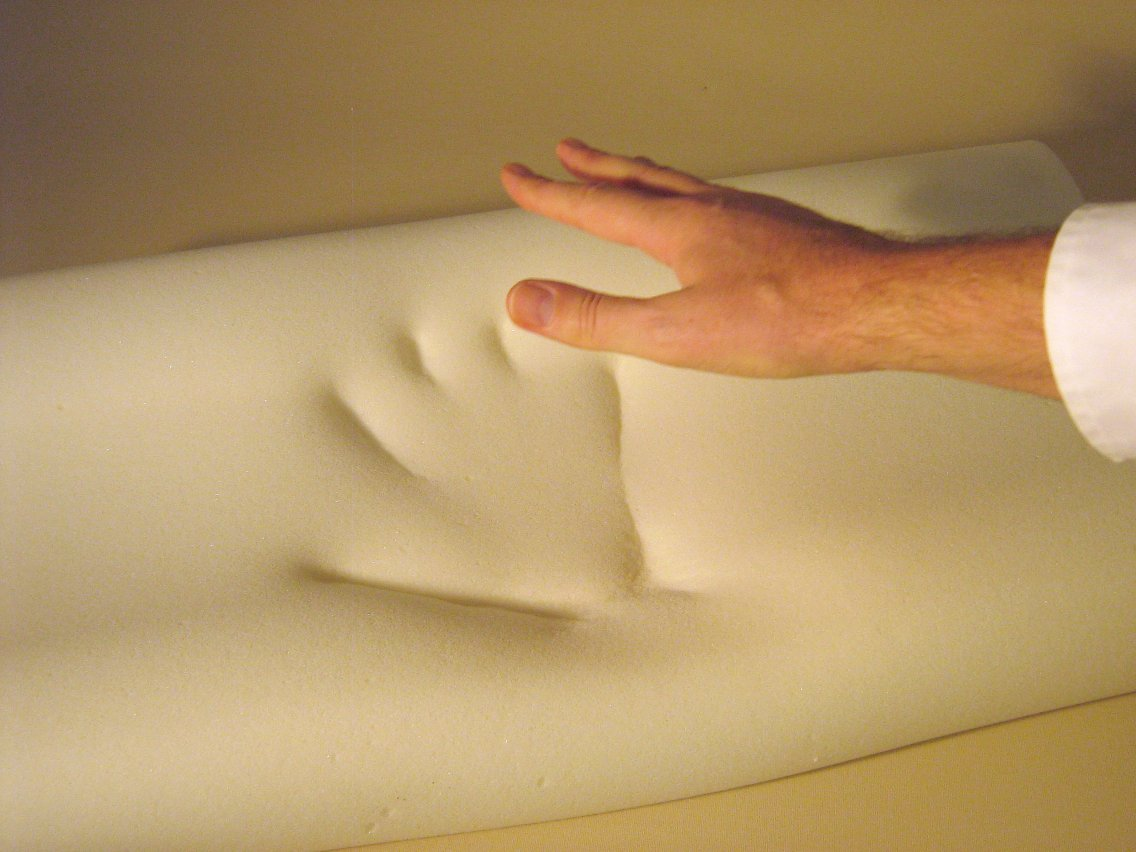
Memory foam

Memory foam consists mainly of polyurethane with additional chemicals that increase its viscosity and density. It is often referred to as "viscoelastic" polyurethane foam, or low-resilience polyurethane foam (LRPu). The foam bubbles or 'cells' are open, effectively creating a matrix through which air can move. Higher-density memory foam softens in reaction to body heat, allowing it to mold to a warm body in a few minutes. Newer foams may recover their original shape more quickly.

== Mechanics ==
Memory foam derives its viscoelastic properties from several effects, due to the material's internal structure. The network effect is the force working to restore the foam's structure when it is deformed. This effect is generated by the deformed porous material pushing outwards to restore its structure against an applied pressure. Three effects work against the network effect, slowing the regeneration of the foam's original structure:

- The pneumatic effect, caused by the time it takes air to flow into the foam's porous structure.
- The adhesive effect, or adhesion, caused by the stickiness of the surfaces within the foam, which work against decompression as the internal pores within the foam are pressed together
- The relaxation effect (the strongest of the three forces working against expansion), caused by the foam's material being near its glass transition temperature—limiting its mobility, forcing any change to be gradual, and slowing the expansion of the foam once the applied pressure has been removed

The effects are temperature-dependent, so the temperature range at which memory foam retains its properties is limited. If it is too cold, it hardens. If it is too hot, it acts like conventional foams, quickly springing back to its original shape. The underlying physics of this process can be described by polymeric creep.

The pneumatic and adhesive effects are strongly correlated with the size of the pores within memory foam. Smaller pores lead to higher internal surface area and reduced air flow, increasing the adhesion and pneumatic effects. Thus the foam's properties can be controlled by changing its cell structure and porosity. Its glass transition temperature can also be modulated by using additives in the foam's material.

Memory foam's mechanical properties can affect the comfort of mattresses produced with it. There is also a trade-off between comfort and durability. Certain memory foams may have a more rigid cell structure, leading to a weaker distribution of weight, but better recovery of the original structure, leading to improved cyclability and durability. Denser cell structure can also resist the penetration of water vapor, leading to reduced weathering and better durability and overall appearance.

== History ==
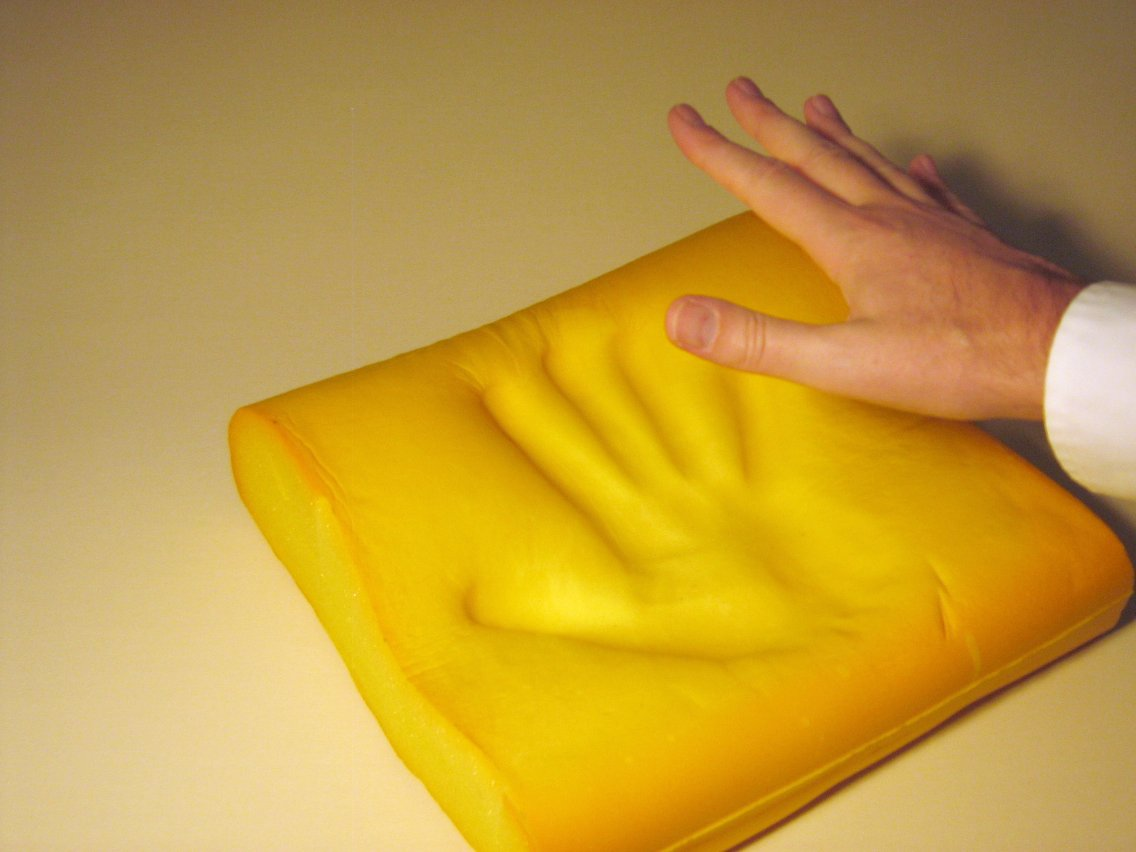
Memory foam with a slower springback than the foam above. Note characteristic polyurethane yellowing caused by light exposure.

Memory foam was developed in 1966 under a contract by NASA's Ames Research Center to improve the safety of aircraft cushions. The temperature-sensitive memory foam was initially referred to as "slow spring back foam"; most called it "temper foam". Created by feeding gas into a polymer matrix, it had an open-cell solid structure that matched pressure against it, yet slowly returned to its original shape.

When NASA released memory foam to the public domain in the early 1980s, Fagerdala World Foams was one of the few companies willing to work with it, as the manufacturing process remained difficult and unreliable. Their 1991 product, the Tempur-Pedic Swedish Mattress eventually led to the mattress and cushion company Tempur World.

Memory foam was initially too expensive for widespread use, but became cheaper. Its most common domestic uses are mattresses, pillows, shoes, and blankets. It has medical uses, such as wheelchair seat cushions, hospital bed pillows and padding for people suffering long-term pain or postural problems. When patients were required to lie immobile in bed, on a firm mattress, for an unhealthy period of time, the pressure on some of their body regions impaired blood flow, causing pressure sores or gangrene. Memory foam mattresses significantly decreased such events, as well as alternating pressure air mattresses.

Later commercialisation of the foam included use in medical equipment such as X-ray table pads, and sports equipment such as American / Canadian football helmet liners.

=== Gel ===
Heat retention can be a disadvantage when used in mattresses and pillows, so in second-generation memory foam, companies began using open cell structure to improve breathability.

In 2006, the third generation of memory foam was introduced. Gel visco or gel memory foam consists of gel particles fused with visco foam to reduce trapped body heat, speed up spring back time and help the mattress feel softer. This technology was originally developed and patented by Peterson Chemical Technology, and gel mattresses became popular with the release of Serta's iComfort line and Simmons's Beautyrest line in 2011. Gel-infused memory foam was next developed with what were described as "beads" containing the gel which, as a phase-change material, achieved the desired temperature stabilization or cooling effect by changing from a solid to a liquid state within the capsule. Changing physical states can significantly alter a material's heat absorption properties.

Since the development of gel memory foam, other materials have been added. Aloe vera, green tea extract and activated charcoal have been combined with it to reduce odors or provide aromatherapy while sleeping. Rayon has been used in woven mattress covers over memory foam beds to wick moisture away from the body to increase comfort. Phase-change materials (PCMs) have also been used in covers on memory foam pillows, beds, and mattress pads. Materials other than polyurethane also have the properties necessary to make memory foam. Polyethylene terephthalate, one such polymeric material, provides certain benefits over polyurethane, such as recyclability, lightness, and thermal insulation.

== Mattresses ==
A memory foam mattress is usually denser than other foam mattresses, making it both more supportive and heavier. Memory foam mattresses are often sold for higher prices than traditional mattresses. Memory foam used in mattresses is commonly manufactured in densities ranging from less than 24kg/m^{3} (1.5 lb/ft^{3}) to 128kg/m^{3} (8 lb/ft^{3}) density. Most standard memory foam has a density of 16–80 kg/m^{3} (1 to 5 lb/ft^{3}). Most bedding, such as topper pads and comfort layers in mattresses, has a density of 48–72 kg/m^{3} (3 to 4.5 lb/ft^{3}). High densities such as 85 kg/m^{3} (5.3 lb/ft^{3}) are used infrequently.

The firmness property (hard to soft) of memory foam is used in determining comfort. It is measured by a foam's indentation force deflection (IFD) rating. However, it is not a complete measurement of a "soft" or "firm" feel. A foam of higher IFD but lower density can feel soft when compressed.

IFD measures the force in newtons (or pounds-force) required to make a dent 1 inch into a foam sample 500 mm × 500 mm × 100 mm (19.7 in × 19.7 in × 3.9 in) by a 323 cm^{3} (50 sq in, 8-inch-diameter) disc—known as IFD @ 25% compression. IFD ratings for memory foams range between super soft (IFD 10) and semi-rigid (IFD 12). Most memory foam mattresses are firm (IFD 12 to IFD 16).

Second and third generation memory foams have an open-cell structure that reacts to body heat and weight by molding to the sleeper's body, helping relieve pressure points, preventing pressure sores, etc. Manufacturers claim that this may help relieve pressure points to relieve pain and promote more restful sleep, although there are no objective studies supporting the mattresses' claimed benefits.

Memory foam mattresses retain body heat, so they can be excessively warm in hot weather. However, gel-type memory foams tend to be cooler due to their greater breathability.

=== Hazards ===
Emissions from memory foam mattresses may directly cause more respiratory irritation than other mattresses. Memory foam, like other polyurethane products, can be combustible. Laws in several jurisdictions have been enacted to require that all bedding, including memory foam items, be resistant to ignition from an open flame such as a candle or cigarette lighter. US bedding laws that went into effect in 2010 change the Cal-117 Bulletin for FR testing.

There is concern that high levels of the fire retardant PBDE commonly used in memory foam could cause health problems for some users. PBDEs are no longer used in most bedding foams, especially in the European Union.

Manufacturers caution about leaving babies and small children unattended on memory foam mattresses, as they may find it difficult to turn over and may suffocate.

The United States Environmental Protection Agency published two documents proposing National Emissions Standards for Hazardous Air Pollutants (HAP) concerning hazardous emissions produced during the making of flexible polyurethane foam products. The HAP emissions associated with polyurethane foam production include methylene chloride, toluene diisocyanate, methyl chloroform, methylene diphenyl diisocyanate, propylene oxide, diethanolamine, methyl ethyl ketone, methanol, and toluene. However, not all chemical emissions associated with the production of these material have been classified. Methylene chloride makes up over 98 percent of the total HAP emissions from this industry. Short-term exposure to high concentrations of methylene chloride also irritates the nose and throat. The effects of chronic (long-term) exposure to methylene chloride in humans involve the central nervous system, and include headaches, dizziness, nausea, and memory loss. Animal studies indicate that inhalation of methylene chloride affects the liver, kidney, and cardiovascular system. Developmental or reproductive effects of methylene chloride have not been reported in humans, but limited animal studies have reported lowered fetal body weights in exposed rats.

== See also ==
- Low-resilience polyurethane
- Sorbothane
- Neoprene
- List of polyurethane applications
