= Indentation force-deflection =

Indentation force-deflection is a process used in the flexible foam manufacturing industry to assess the "softness" of a sample of foam such as memory foam. To conduct an IFD test, a circular flat indenter with a surface area of 323 square centimeters (50 sq. inches - 8" in diameter) is pressed against a foam sample usually 100 mm thick and with an area of 500 mm by 500 mm (ASTM standard D3574). The foam sample is first placed on a flat table perforated with holes to allow the passage of air. It is then "warmed up" by being compressed twice to 75% "strain", and then allowed to recover for six minutes. The force is measured 60 seconds after achieving 25% indentation with the indenter. Lower scores correspond with less firmness; higher scores with greater firmness. US measurements are given in pounds-force, and European ones are given in newtons.
