= Active heave compensation =

Technique used to reduce the influence of waves upon lifting and drilling operations

Active heave compensation (AHC) is a technique used on lifting equipment to reduce the influence of waves upon offshore operations. AHC differs from passive heave compensation by having a control system that actively tries to compensate for any movement at a specific point, using power to gain accuracy.

== Principles ==
The purpose of AHC is to keep a load, held by equipment on a moving vessel, motionless with regard to the seabed or another vessel. Commercial offshore cranes usually use a Motion reference unit (MRU) or pre-set measurement position detection to detect the current ship displacements and rotations in all directions. A control system, often PLC or computer based, then calculates how the active parts of the system are to react to the movement. The performance of an AHC system is normally limited by power, motor speed and torque, by measurement accuracy and delay, or by computing algorithms. Choice of control method, like using preset values or delayed signals, may affect performance and give large residual motions, especially with unusual waves.

State of the art AHC systems are real time systems that can calculate and compensate any displacement in a matter of milliseconds. Accuracy then depends on the forces on the system, and thus the shape of the waves more than the size of the waves.

== Application ==
=== Electric winch systems ===
In an electric winch system, the wave movement is compensated by automatically driving the winch in the opposite direction at the same speed. The hook of the winch will thus keep its position relative to the seabed. AHC winches are used in ROV-systems and for lifting equipment that is to operate near or at the seabed. Active compensation can include tension control, aiming to keep wire tension at a certain level while operating in waves. Guide-wires, used to guide a load to an underwater position, may use AHC and tension control in combination.

=== Hydraulic winch systems ===
Hydraulic cranes can use hydraulic cylinders to compensate, or they can utilize a hydraulic winch. Hydraulic "active boost" winches control the oil flow from the pump(s) to the winch so that the target position is reached. Hydraulic winch systems can use accumulators and passive heave compensation to form a semi-active system with both an active and a passive component. In such systems the active part will take over when the passive system is too slow or inaccurate to meet the target of the AHC control system. AHC cranes need to calculate the vertical displacement and/or the velocity of the crane tip position in order to actively heave compensate a load sub-sea.

A good AHC-crane is able to keep its load steady with a deviation of a few centimeters in waves up to 8m (+/-4m).

AHC cranes are typically used for sub-sea lifting operations or construction, and special rules applies to certified heave compensating equipment.

US navy have used AHC to create a Roll-On/Roll-Off (Ro/Ro) system for two vessels or floating platforms at sea. The system is utilizing AHC via hydraulic cylinders. This system is, according to some, currently not commercially interesting due to costs, limited use and huge amount of power.

The latest development is to compensate not only the vertical direction but also the horizontal directions, making it possible to perform operations on offshore windmills.

=== AHC for Towing Operations ===
When towing side-scan sonars or scientific sampling systems, the stability of the towed equipment is important for data quality. These towed systems usually have low water resistance, and Constant Tension (CT) does not help stabilize the equipment when the vessel is affected by waves. AHC is in most cases a better solution for stabilizing the towed body. The AHC controller uses information about the towing depth and length of the towing line to calculate the angle of the towing line. This is used to drive the winch to compensate for the towing point movement and ensures that the towed device moves smoothly through the sea.

== New generation AHC Controllers ==
Active Heave Compensation has mainly been applied in the offshore oil and gas sector where the development has been focused on increasing the capacities of the compensating winches or cylinders. Cost and complexity of AHC systems have limited the use of this technology in other subsea applications, such as marine research. Control technology advancements in recent years are allowing AHC to become more standardized and available for applications where cost and simplicity are significant.

A new generation AHC controller with an integrated MRU (motion sensor) is now available, making it easier for winch and crane manufacturers to integrate AHC into their products without involving external experts.

== See also ==
- Wire rope spooling technology
