= Hydraulic jigger =

Hydraulically powered mechanical winch

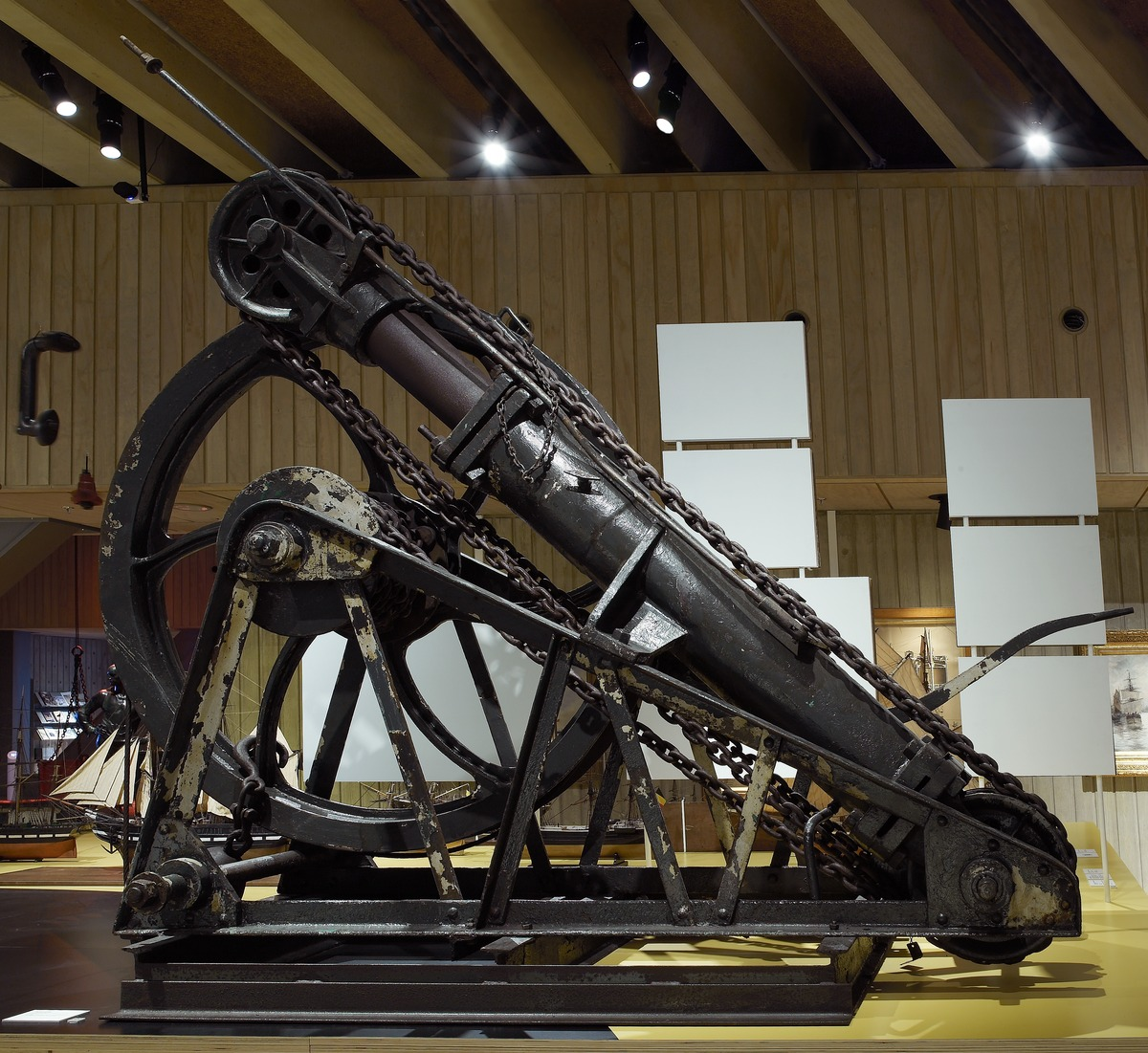
Armstrong jigger winch of 1888

A hydraulic jigger is a hydraulically-powered mechanical winch.

From the mid-19th century, hydraulic power became available throughout the increasingly modern dockyards and warehouses. This was generated centrally and distributed by pipework, either around a dock estate, or across a city by the new hydraulic power networks.

The jigger was developed by William Armstrong, around 1840, as part of his hydraulic crane The hydraulic crane was the invention that first made his fortune and established the engineering and armaments firm of Armstrongs of Elswick. Armstrong's original invention of the jigger has been questioned, but he was the first to make widespread use of it.

== Operation ==
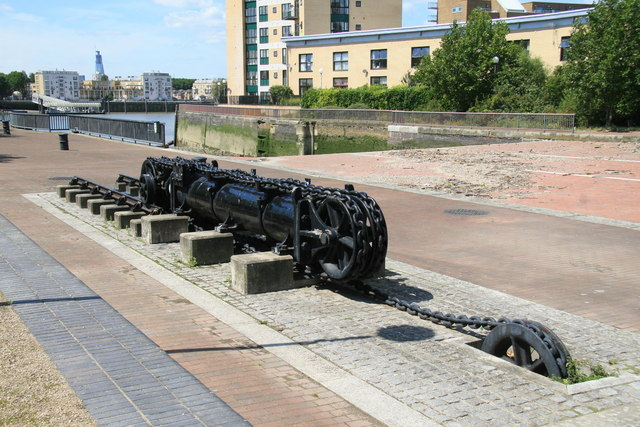
A decommissioned jigger, once used to open dock gates at Millwall Docks in London

The jigger was one of the first hydraulic machines of the Victorian age, after Bramah's hydraulic press but before the continuously-rotating hydraulic motor. It allowed the mechanism of the ram to be used to move over a usefully long distance, not merely the length of the ram.

A jigger works like a pulley block, but in reverse. Rather than turning an easy pull on a rope into a powerful lift, the jigger uses the powerful force of a hydraulic ram, but limited in how far it can travel, to pull a long length of chain. The chain is looped several times lengthwise around the ram cylinder, running over a number of pulleys at each end. When the cylinder moves, the pull on the end of the chain is multiplied by the number of loops. The force of the jigger's pull is reduced similarly, according to how many times the chain was looped. As the cylinder had adequate power to begin with, and could simply be made larger in diameter when needed, this was not a significant limit on the jigger's force.

Unlike cylinders, jiggers always provided a tension pull, rather than a compressive push.

The first jiggers pre-dated the development of flexible steel wire rope and so they used wrought iron chain, rather than the natural fibre rope otherwise available. Later machines did switch to wire rope.

=== Concentric cylinders ===
Some applications, such as cranes, needed to lift both heavy and light (empty hook) weights. Loaded, heavy, lifts were made by the conventional cylinder, its diameter sized according to the maximum capacity. However even a light load on such a piston would still consume the same quantity of high-pressure water, which was charged for by consumption. To reduce this effect, compound pistons were used: two concentric pistons. When unloaded, the smaller central piston would move first. Only if this was held down by the load, the larger outer piston would also begin to move, lifting both pistons and the full load together. (Note: A similar problem with the inability to throttle hydraulic motors led to the development of variable-stroke hydraulic motors.)

== Applications ==
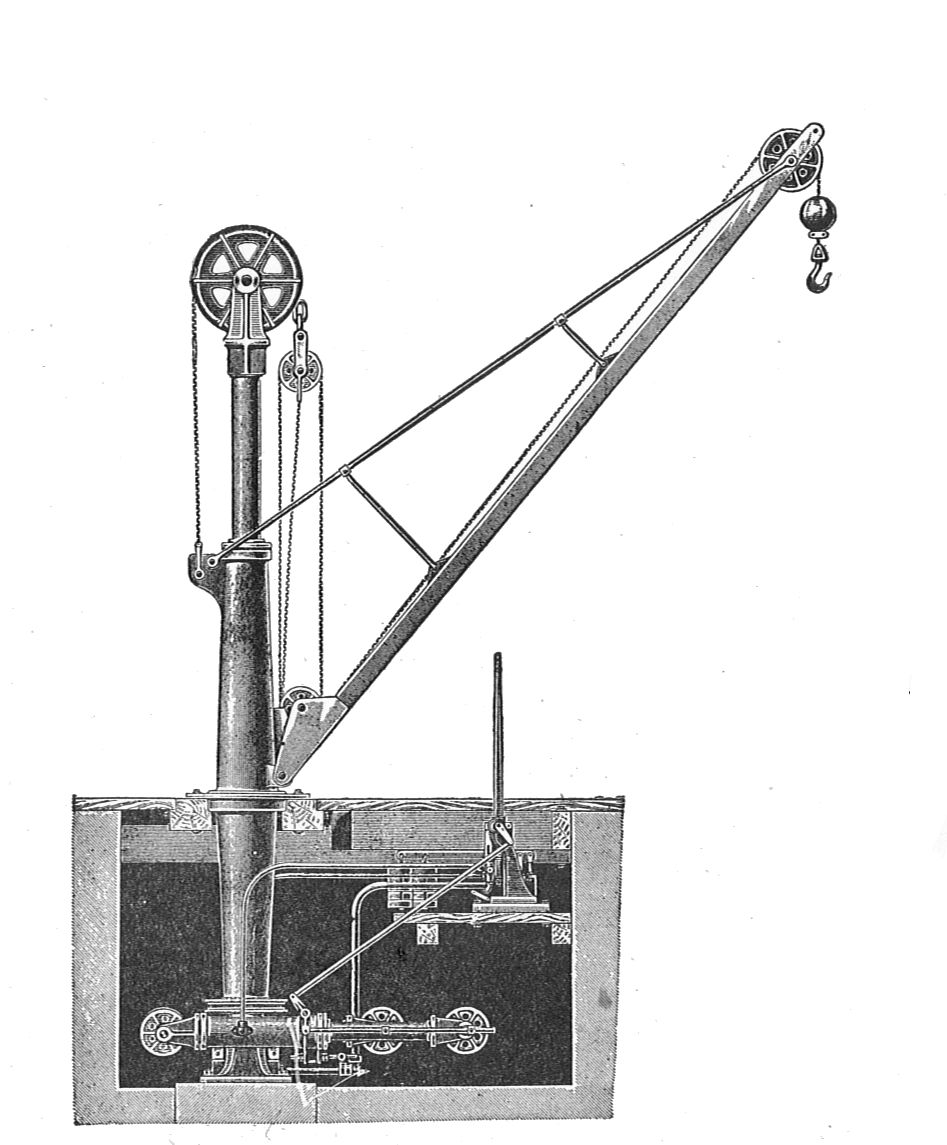
Small hydraulic crane, c. 1900. The jigger cylinders are horizontal, at the foot of the column.

The basic jigger mechanism was used very widely, for a range of machines across dockyards, warehouses, railway yards and engineering workshops. They were even to be found in theatres, lifting the stage curtains.

=== Cranes ===
The first application of jiggers had been for Armstrong's first hydraulic crane and this remained an important application for them.

A distinctive type of crane was the warehouse wall crane or 'whip'. The ram was mounted vertically on an outside wall with a small jib or fixed pulley above it. The space available by external mounting allowed the use of long cylinders and very long lifts, spanning several floors.

=== Portable winches ===
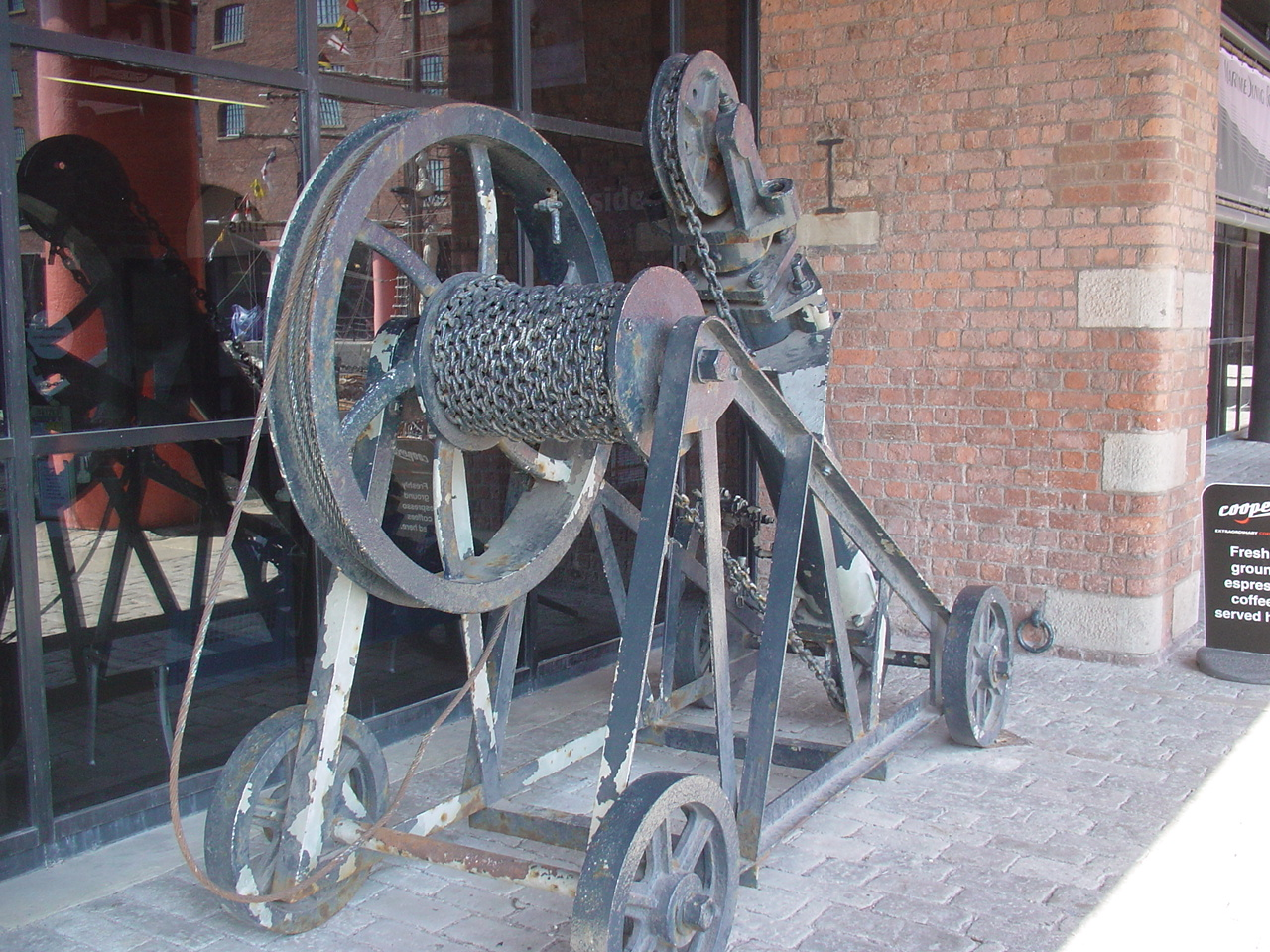
Portable winch, used in the Albert Dock, Liverpool

Many dockyards used small portable jiggers mounted on wheeled carriages. These could be moved around the quays as needed, and plumbed into outlets in the hydraulic mains with screwed pipe unions. They were used as portable winches for all manner of tasks. A typical task would be winching bales out of the hold of a ship, up a sloping gangway. Bales of bulk products such as jute or cotton were made too large and heavy for dockers to lift by hand, and the jigger appeared at a time when cranes were still only in limited numbers.

=== Lifts ===
Jiggers were also used for freight lifts in warehouses and factories. These were not accepted for passenger carrying though, until 1854 and Elisha Otis' invention of the safety brake, to prevent the carriage falling if the hoisting cable were to break.

=== Catapult launch ===
British aircraft carriers of World War II used a form of pneumatic-hydraulic jigger to power their aircraft catapults. The catapults had a 96 ft (29 m) travel and an 8:1 pulley ratio, requiring a 12 ft (3.7 m) power cylinder. One side of the cylinder was connected to a manifold of a dozen high-pressure compressed air bottles. Power for launching was supplied by the compressed air. (Note: The power, i.e. rate of work, needed was far more than could be supplied by a hydraulic pump. Rather than using a hydraulic accumulator, probably relying on compressed air pressure, the air pressure was used directly.) The other side was filled with hydraulic fluid. When the launch valve was triggered, the hydraulic fluid pressure dropped rapidly as fluid was vented into an unpressurised catch tank. The piston was forced rapidly from the air end to the hydraulic end, pulling the crosshead and the jigger pulleys and drawing the launch trolley forwards. The average acceleration for an aircraft was 1 g, with a peak of 2.5 g.

After launching, the piston was decelerated within the cylinder by a conical protrusion entering a narrow choke ring, and the hydraulic resistance increasing as the flow area reduced. Hydraulic fluid was then pumped from the catch tank by an electric pump and back into the cylinder under pressure. The cylinder was double-ended, with a piston rod and jigger at each end, and the catapult was retracted by the hydraulic pressure forcing the piston backwards, and re-compressing the air reservoirs.

== See also ==
- Hydraulic intensifier
- Marine riser tensioner
