= Information-led development =

Information-led development (ILD) is a development strategy whereby a developing country makes as a primary economic policy focus the creation and development of a national information technology (IT) sector with the express aim of relying on this sector as an engine of growth. Notable examples of such countries are India and the Philippines. Increasingly, tools from information-led development are being used for community economic development in both developed countries and emerging markets.

== Information-led development as community economic development ==
More recently, a new formulation of ILD has emerged. With origins in community economic development in the United States, the new ILD model describes the use of data to generate actionable information or information solutions to development challenges. Examples of this include the inclusion of non-financial payment obligations in consumer credit files, also known as alternative data, and the use of this information in underwriting, as a means to reduce financial exclusion in the United States, where an estimated 54 million Americans are shut out of mainstream credit access as there is insufficient information about them in their credit files to be scored by a credit scoring model. This variant of ILD was pioneered by PERC, a non-profit policy research organization and development intermediary headquartered in Chapel Hill, North Carolina. Other US-based organizations, including Social Compact and the Local Initiatives Support Corporation, employ variants of ILD, but none has applied this internationally except for PERC.

This development model is gaining traction in emerging markets such as Colombia and South Africa, where the data is being used to reduce financial exclusion and facilitate credit access as a means to build wealth and form assets. It is also attracting increasing attention from development agencies, including USAID, the International Finance Corporation, the World Bank Group, and the Consultative Group to Assist the Poor.

== See also ==
- Political and Economic Research Council
- Local Initiatives Support Corporation
- Economic development
