= Marine riser tensioner =

Device used on an offshore drilling vessel

A marine riser tensioner is a device used on an offshore drilling vessel which provides a near constant upward force on the drilling riser independent of the movement of the floating drill vessel.

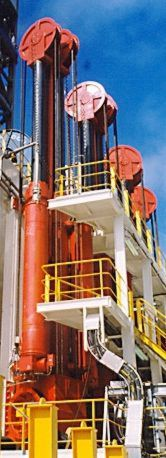
Aker Kvaerner MH Marine Riser Tensioner (MRT)

The marine riser is connected to the wellhead on the sea bed and therefore the tensioner must manage the differential movements between the riser and the rig. If there were no tensioner and the rig moves downward, the riser would buckle; if the rig rises then high forces would be transmitted to the riser and it would stretch and be damaged.

Tensioners have historically been composed of hydraulically actuated cylinders with wire sheaves. More recently, active electrical motors have been used for compensation purposes.

== Hydraulic Tensioner ==
A hydraulic riser tensioner consists of a hydraulic cylinder with sheaves at both sides. The cylinder is connected to a number of high-pressure gas bottles via a medium separator. A wire rope is rigged in the cylinder; one end is connected to the fixed part of the tensioner, the other end is connected to the riser.

On board a drill rig tensioners are usually required for drill string compensator, riser tensioner, and guideline tensioner.

== See also ==
- Hydraulic jigger
