= Sorbothane =

Synthetic polymer

Sorbothane is the brand name of a synthetic viscoelastic urethane polymer used as a shock absorber and vibration damper. It is manufactured by Sorbothane, Inc., based in Kent, Ohio.

== History ==
Sorbothane was invented and patented in 1982 by Dr. Maurice Hiles, a British inventor. It was prepared by mixing polyol and isocyanate. His research into the energy dissipation properties of human soft tissue disclosed a structure very similar to an interpenetrating polymer network. This led to his synthesis of the first commercial simultaneous interpenetrating network, now called Sorbothane. Dr. Hiles wrote in his patent "The resulting solid polymer behaves like a quasi-liquid, being readily deformed by an applied force and slow to recover, although in the absence of such a force it takes up a defined shape and volume". In 1976, he contacted the National Research Development Corporation (NRDC) about his invention; the NRDC spent almost £10,000 in helping him to improve and patent the polymer. BTR Industries obtained the license from NRDC for selling them.

== Properties ==
The material combines some of the properties of rubber, silicone, and other elastic polymers. It is considered to be a good vibration damping material, an acoustic insulator, and highly durable. An unusually high amount of the energy from an object dropped onto Sorbothane is absorbed. The feel and damping qualities of Sorbothane have been likened to those of meat.

Sorbothane is a visco-elastic material, meaning that it exhibits properties of both liquids (viscous solutions) and solids (elastic materials), with a relaxation time of two seconds. Because visco-elastic behavior is desirable in shock and vibration applications, many materials claim to be viscoelastic; however, many of these materials have only trace viscoelastic properties.

Similar materials include polynorbornene, Noene, and Astro-sorb.

== Uses ==
Sorbothane has many industrial applications, from acoustic shielding to machine mounts. It has been used to quiet personal computers by being packed around the hard drive and other noisy spinning components. Sorbothane damps vibration transmission from vibrating hardware. In addition, Sorbothane has been used by NASA to isolate vibration, in the Air Force Memorial, and to transport the Liberty Bell. It is currently used with insoles and heel pads to absorb impacts during sports activities such as football, cricket, and rugby. It is also used in recoil pads of guns.

== See also ==
- Acoustic foam
- Quiet PC
- Memory foam
- Neoprene
- Vibration isolation
- Bushing (isolator)
- Anechoic chamber
- Soundproofing
- D3o
- BASF Polyurethanes
