= Polyimide foam =

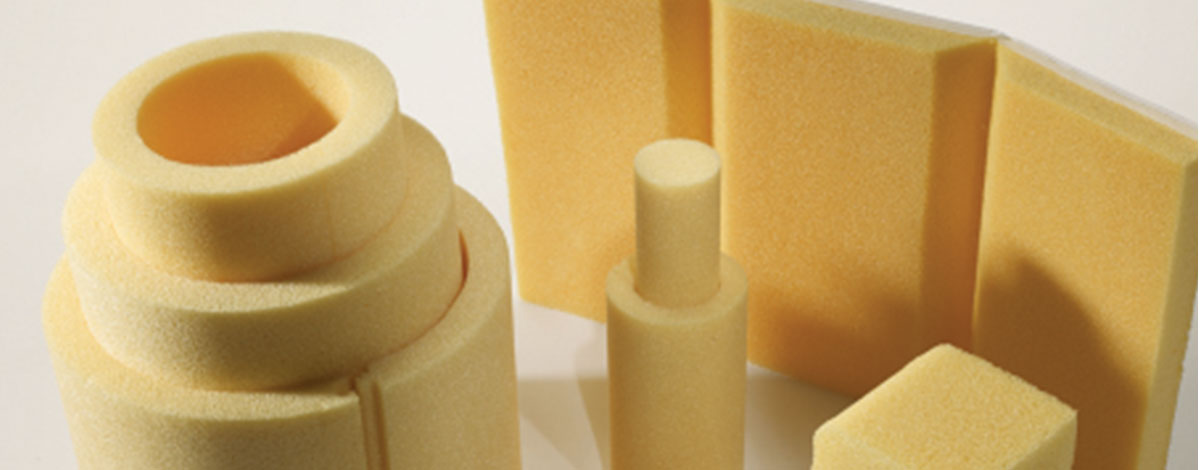
Solimide-branded polyimide foam

Polyimide foam is a foam originally designed for NASA by Inspec Foams Inc. under the brand name Solimide. Its primary purposes are as an insulator (such as for rocket fuels) and acoustic damper. NASA engineered the product to have relatively low outgassing (a problem in vacuum and aboard spacecraft), desirable thermal and acoustic performance, as well as uniformity during distribution and application. Typical uses of the foam include ducting, duct/piping insulation, structural components, and strengthening of hollow components while remaining lightweight. In addition to thermal and acoustic properties, polyimide foam is fire resistant, lightweight and non-toxic.

== See also ==
- Aerogel – Synthetic ultralight solid material
- Polyimide – Class of polymers
- Ferroelectret – thin films of polymer foams, exhibiting piezoelectric and pyroelectric properties after electric charging
