= Gas spring =

Type of spring

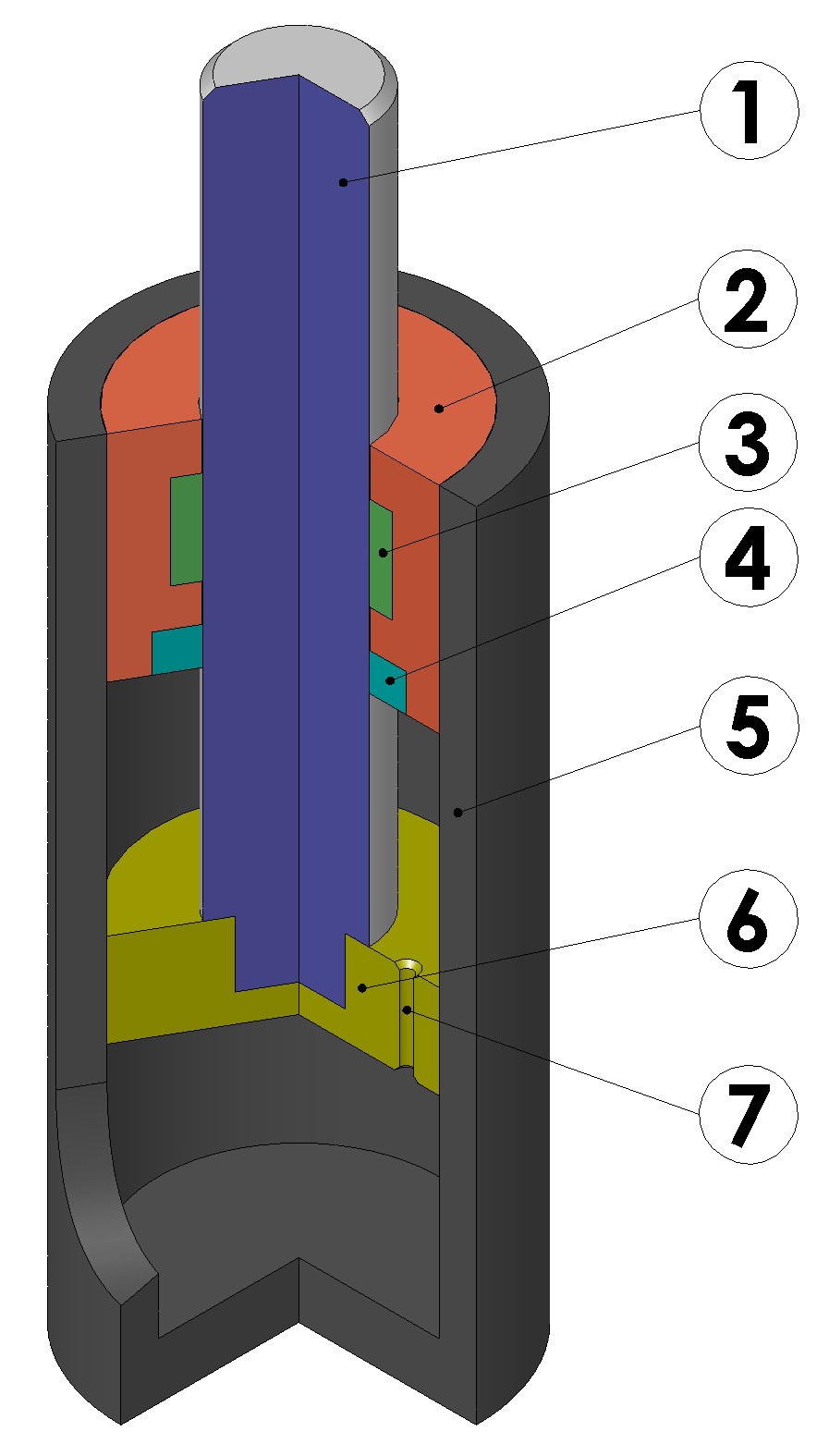
Simplified constant-force pneumatic gas spring with sectional view: 1. Piston rod; 2. Head cap; 3. Guide bushing; 4. Seal; 5. Cylinder; 6. Piston; 7. Flow-restriction orifice

A gas spring, also known as a gas strut or gas damper, is a type of spring that, unlike a typical mechanical spring that relies on elastic deformation, uses compressed gas contained within an enclosed cylinder. They rely on a sliding piston to pneumatically store potential energy and withstand external force applied parallel to the direction of the piston shaft (loosely analogous similarly to a bicycle pump without a gas outlet).

Gas springs are used in automobiles to support hatches, hoods, and covers. They are also used in furniture and doors, as well as in medical beds. They are used industrially in machine tool presses. Fast-acting gas springs are used in aerospace design and weapons applications, and large, extended gas springs are used in passive heave compensators, which stabilize drilling operations against waves.

Gas springs are usually implemented in one of two ways. A pneumatic suspension gas spring directly compresses a chamber of air with the piston. A hydro-pneumatic suspension gas spring instead compresses a chamber of oil linked to an accumulator in which the pressure of the oil compresses the gas. Nitrogen is a common gas in gas springs because it is inert and nonflammable.

== Principle of operation ==
A gas spring consists of a sealed cylinder filled with a charge of high-pressure gas, a piston rod attached to a piston with a sliding seal, and some oil. The piston (or the cylinder wall) contains a number of channels that allow the gas to transfer between the lower chamber (between the piston and the closed end of the cylinder) and the upper chamber (between the piston and the head cap). This causes the pressure in both chambers to equalize no matter how far the piston is pushed down the tube.

In the ideal case of a piston moving with zero friction through a fully sealed cylinder, there are two key phenomena which can be thought of as acting simultaneously inside the spring as it is compressed. Firstly, as the spring is compressed and the piston rod is pushed into the cylinder, the gaseous volume of the cylinder decreases due to the extra space now being occupied by the solid piston rod. This would be the case even if there were no piston attached to the rod, as the volume of the rod displaces an equal volume of gas, but the total volume of the enclosing cylinder remains a constant. This means the pressure of the gas increases. Second, the bottom of the piston always experiences a greater force opposite to the compressing action than the top, because pressure is a scalar quantity: it acts equally in all directions. The gas on both sides of the piston will be at equal pressure due to the equalizing channels, but the gas in the "lower" chamber has more surface area of the piston available to push on than the gas in the "upper" chamber, due to the rod. Since pressure is force per unit area, more area at the same pressure necessarily means more force. This is the reason the piston is present.

=== Other details ===
According to Hooke's law, if the internal plunger features a diaphragm that extends to the side of the gas tube, it will stop moving once the applied force becomes constant and will support a weight, like a normal spring. Some gas springs have fine holes in the plunger for additional damping: these are called "slow-damper springs" and are common on safety gates and doors. A gas spring designed for fast operation(s) is termed a "quick gas spring" and is used in the manufacture of air guns and recoil buffers.

It is possible to reduce the gas volume and increase its internal pressure by means of a movable end stop, or by allowing one tube to slide over another, allowing the characteristics of a gas spring to be adjusted during operation. The rod may be hollow by use of clever seals, or it may consist of multiple small-diameter rods. A small amount of oil is normally present.

The gas may be introduced by a Schrader-type valve, using a lip seal around the rod and forcing it to allow gas in by external overpressure or a shuttling O-ring system. Gas springs with high caliber contain a very large amount of energy, and can be used as a power pack. In emergency use, the gas may be introduced via a gas generator cell, similar to those used in airbags.

== Variations ==
A gas spring can be given adjustable push-in force via a local knob or remote via a Bowden wire.

Extended stroke is usually acquired through telescoping mechanisms, composed of one rod and multiple cylinders, where the smaller of the two cylinders actually acts as a second rod extending in and out of the larger cylinder.

There are also techniques to make variable-lift gas springs. These are intended for short production runs and prototypes, and in applications where the exact force is important but hard to estimate in advance, such as lifting a lid slowly in a known time. In this case, the cylinder is supplied filled to maximum design pressure but equipped with a bleed port to allow gas to be released once installed. The intention is that the design can be over-sprung, and then the pressure is reduced in stages to optimize behavior. If too much gas is released, a new spring must be installed.

It is also possible to make degressive gas springs, where the spring becomes more, not less, powerful as the main cylinder expands.

== Consequences ==
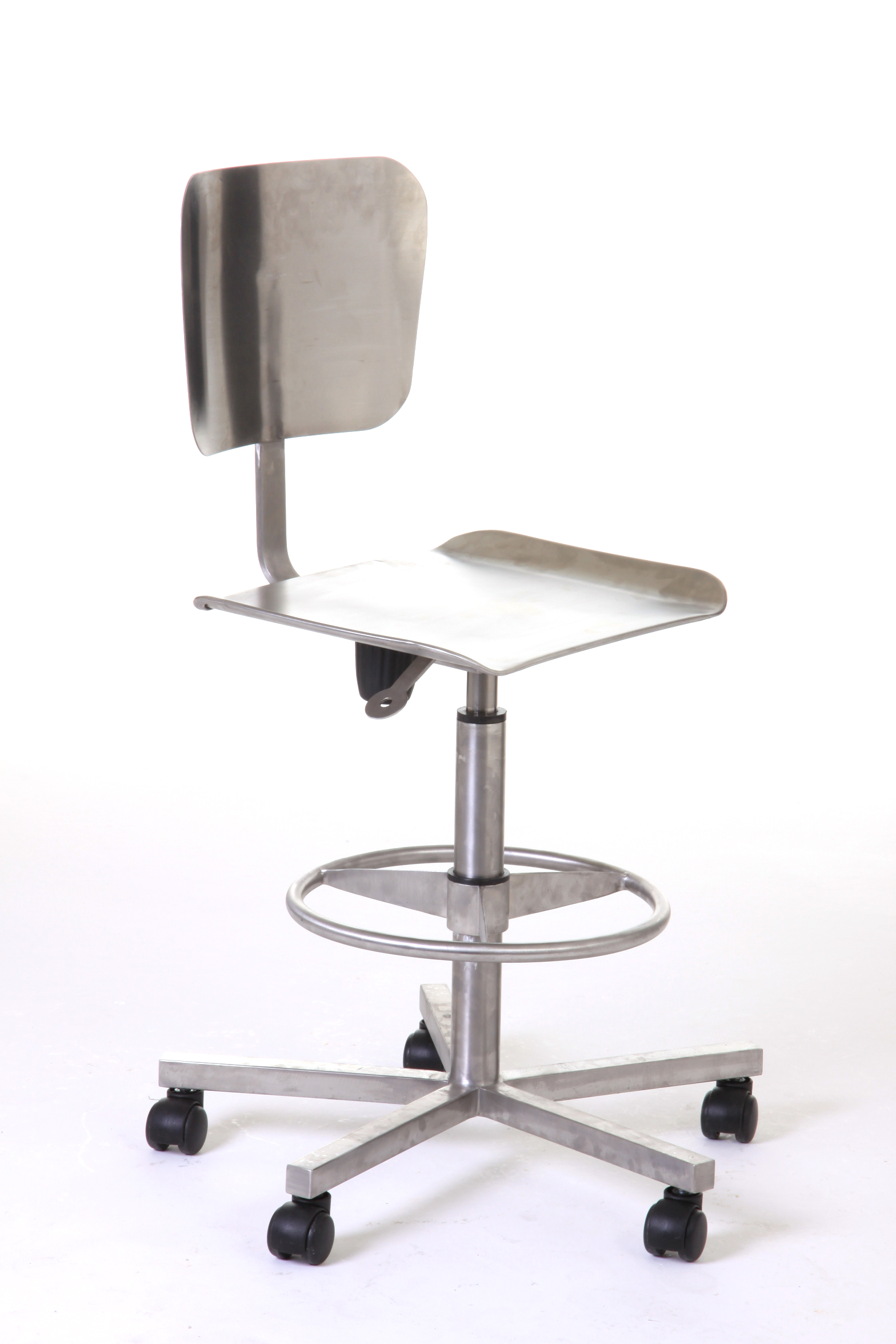
A chair with a gas spring

=== Poor manufacturing ===
Gas springs are often used in office chairs, truck tailgates, and wheelchairs, to name a few. A rare concern with gas springs is that if it is made cheaply, using air as its internal gas, the oxygen will combust given enough force. This is because oxygen, by definition, is the reason for combustibility, whereas nitrogen is not combustible and does not enable combustibility. Oxygen is not flammable itself, but it will oxidize internal parts under high heat. The internal parts of the gas spring, under great tension and heat, then explode with any oil or grease within the gas spring. An incident in 2008 involved an elderly man who suffered severe injuries due to a 150-millimetre (5.9 in) rod forcefully ejected from the explosion of an office chair.

There are a few common signs of failure for gas springs. To list a few: leakage of gases, failure to support its weight capacity, unusual noises, excessive bouncing, and sagging.

== See also ==
- Pneumatic valve springs
- Shock absorber
