= Drill string compensator =

Part on a drilling vessel

A drill string compensator decreases the influence of the heave of a drilling vessel on the drill bit. Drill string compensators are also known under the more general name: heave compensator. Drill string compensators are used onboard drill ships and semi-submersible drill rigs. There are two major types of drill string compensators:

- Drill string compensator between the traveling block and hook .
- Top mounted heave compensator

Drill string compensators are just giant springs between the drill bit and rig. These consist of one or more hydraulic cylinders and air bottles. In between, a medium separator is sometimes used. If there is no spring element, movement of the drill rig would immediately place enormous forces on the drill bit and pull the drill bit off the bottom of the hole. A spring has a force/displacement curve. To get only small force variations on the drill bit, the hysteresis of the spring should be small and the curve should be horizontal, or the gas volume should be large. This is more difficult for a hook-mounted compensator than for a top-mounted one. Several patents are in use for a solution to provide this horizontal curve with a relatively small volume of gas. It will be clear that these (kinematic) constructions can in fact only be used in a top-mounted heave compensator.

== Semi active drill string compensator ==
To improve the load/heave curve there is a semi-active system. In this case, the largest part of the load is taken by the passive heave compensator and an extra active device, working in parallel, takes care of the increase of the load/heave curve and hysteresis.

The combination of PDSC (passive drill string compensation) and AHC (active heave compensation) are now in operation on the semi-submersible drilling rig Seadrill West Sirius (2008). The systems are installed on newer generation deep water drilling semi-submersible drill rigs and drill ships.

== Active drill string compensator ==
For the best precision, and to be able to compensate within a large range of weights, an active heave compensation could be used. The compensation would then be performed by the hoisting device (Drawworks), that would pay out or feed in wire according to estimated rig position in according to seabed. The technology of doing compensation prior to the actual change in weight ensures low fluctuations and better control for both the position and the weight on bit (WOB).
