= Synchronous lateral excitation =

Pedestrian-induced oscillation phenomenon in footbridges

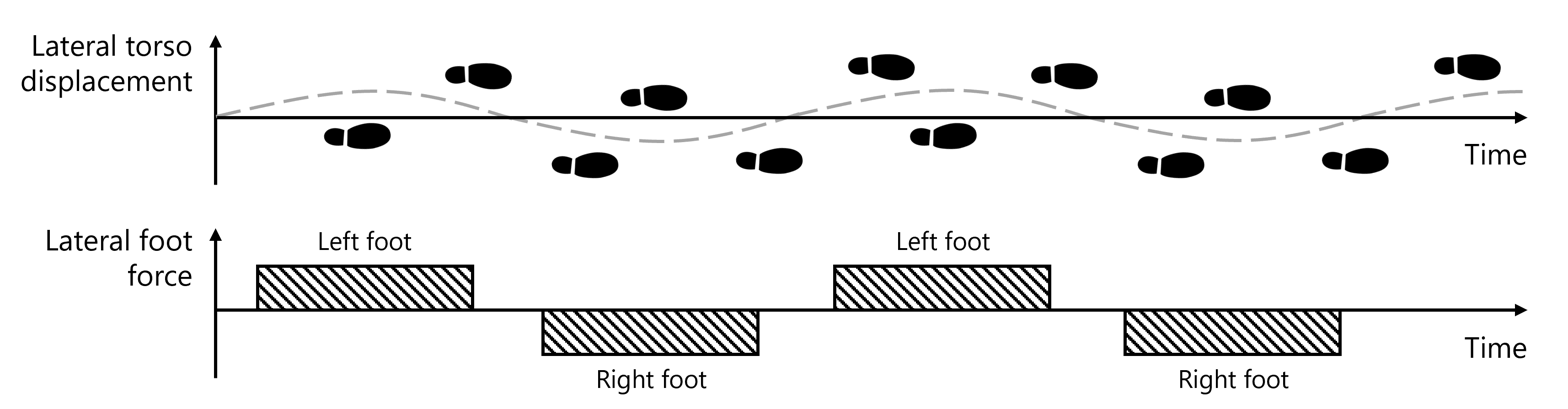
When a pedestrian walks in sync with a ground oscillation, the lateral foot forces exacerbate already existing oscillations, leading to a positive feedback loop known as synchronous lateral excitation. Adapted from Figure 5-15 of Butz, C., et al. "Advanced load models for synchronous pedestrian excitation and optimized design guidelines for steel footbridges (SYNPEX)." RFCS-Research Project RFS-CR-03019 (2007).

Synchronous lateral excitation is a dynamic phenomenon where pedestrians walking on a footbridge subconsciously synchronize their lateral footsteps with the bridge's natural swaying motion, amplifying lateral vibrations. First widely recognized during the 2000 opening of the London Millennium Bridge, synchronous lateral excitation has since become a critical consideration in the design of lightweight pedestrian structures.

== Mechanism ==
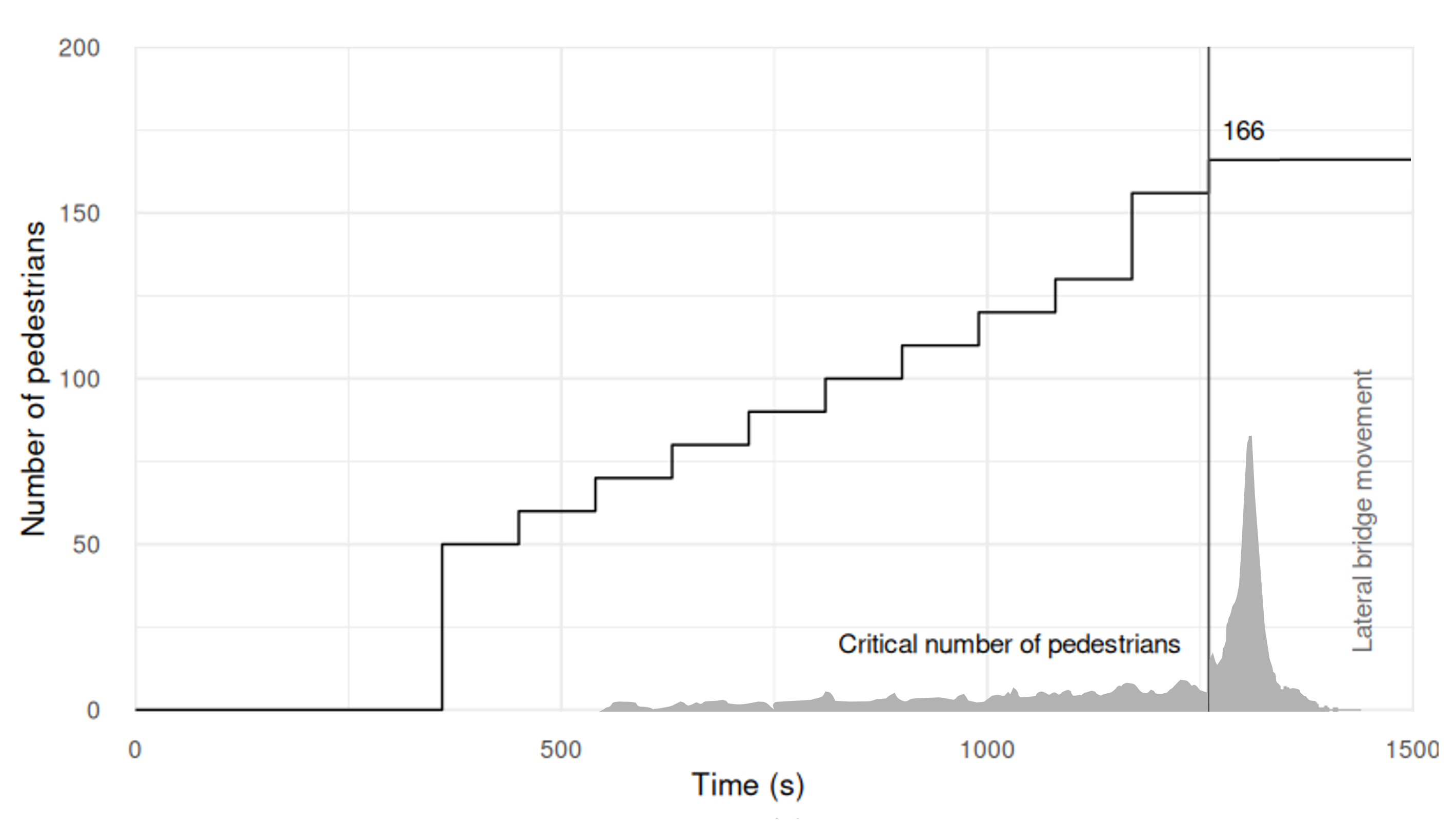
As the number of pedestrians on a footbridge increases (black line in steps), the lateral oscillations increase (gray area). After a critical number of pedestrians is reached (166 in this example), the bridge enters a stage of synchronous lateral excitation. Simplified graph based on page 37 of Parker, Matt. Humble Pi: A Comedy of Maths Errors. Penguin UK, 2019.

Synchronous lateral excitation arises from two interrelated synchronization processes. The first is the pedestrian-structure synchronization, where slight lateral bridge movements (e.g., from wind or random pedestrian steps) prompt walkers to adjust their gait to match the bridge's oscillation frequency, increasing lateral forces. The second is pedestrian-pedestrian synchronization, where individuals unconsciously align their stepping patterns, further reinforcing the resonant force.

== Key cases ==
- The London Millennium Bridge experienced lateral vibrations up to 70 mm due to synchronous lateral excitation, requiring a £5M retrofit with dampers.
- The Auckland Harbour Bridge experienced a lateral frequency of 0.67 Hz during a 1975 demonstration.
- The Birmingham NEC Link bridge experienced a lateral frequency of 0.7 Hz.
- The Toda Park Bridge in Japan is an early documented case (1990s) studied by Fujino et al., informing later synchronous lateral excitation models.

== Mitigation strategies ==
Some ways to avoid synchronous lateral excitation are the implementation of tuned mass dampers, which were used in the Millennium Bridge to increase damping from 0.5% to 20% critical. Other strategies involve designing bridges with lateral frequencies outside the 0.5–1.1 Hz range as well as managing crowds by limiting pedestrian density during events.
