= Kamikatsu Zero-waste Center =

Waste management facility in Tokushima, Japan

- 上勝町ゼロ・ウェイストセンター
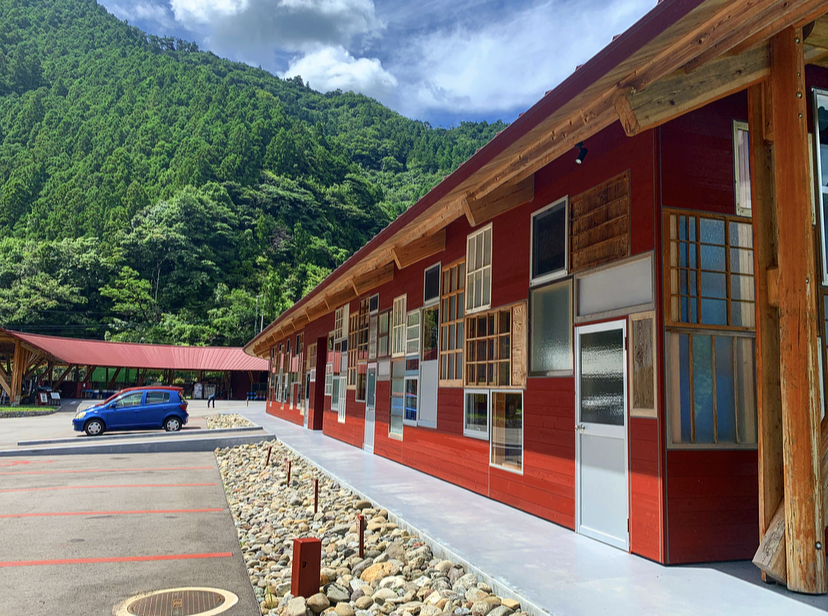

General information
- Location: 7-2 Aza Shimoniura, Oaza Fukuhara, Kamikatsu-cho, Katsura-gun, Tokushima, Japan
- Opened: May 30, 2020
- Owner: Kamikatsu-cho

Design and construction
- Architects: Architecture design: Hiroshi Nakamura (ja:中村拓志) & NAP; Structure design: Yamada Noriaki Structural Design Office Co., Ltd
- Awards: 2021 – AIJ Prize, Architectural Design Division 2021 – Japan Institute of Architects Environmental Architecture Award 2021 – Dezeen Awards, sustainable building of the year 2021 – Ministry of Internal Affairs and Communications, Furusato Zukuri Awards, Grand Prize

Kamikatsu Zero-waste Center (also known as "WHY") is a waste management and materials recovery facility that recycles over 80 percent of the waste produced in Kamikatsu, which is much higher than the 20 percent average in the rest of Japan. It is at the center of what The Washington Post describes as an "ambitious path toward a zero-waste life".

== History ==
- May 20, 2020 – Opening.
- April 16, 2021 – Received the Architectural Institute of Japan Award for Best Work.
- January 24, 2021 – Received Grand Prize for the Ministry of Internal Affairs and Communications's Furusato Zukuri Awards.

== Facilities ==
Made predominantly using waste materials such as used windows, the facilities are in the shape of a question mark.

- Waste separation station, stock yard.
- Kuru Kuru Shop, a reuse shop.
- Learning center.
- Laundromat and restrooms.
- Collaborative laboratory.
- Hotel WHY, where guests experience the town's recycling system.

== Zero-waste policy in Kamikatsu ==
Kamikatsu is a "zero waste" town, all household waste is separated into 45 different categories and sent to be recycled. In 2008, a poll showed that 40 percent of residents were still unhappy about the aspect of the policy that required items to be washed. But the town continues the policy as it is cheaper and more environmentally friendly than purchasing an incinerator. The town recycles about 80 percent of its waste, compared to 20 percent in the rest of Japan, which is still relatively high compared to the USA at 9 percent and the Philippines at less than 5 percent, according to a Rappler article. The town has set a goal to become fully zero waste by 2020.

== Architectural awards ==
- 2021 – Architectural Institute of Japan Award for Best Work
- 2021 – Japan Institute of Architects Environmental Architecture Award
- 2021 – Dezeen Awards, sustainable building of the year
