= Millennium Bridge, London =

Bridge over the River Thames in England

Millennium Bridge
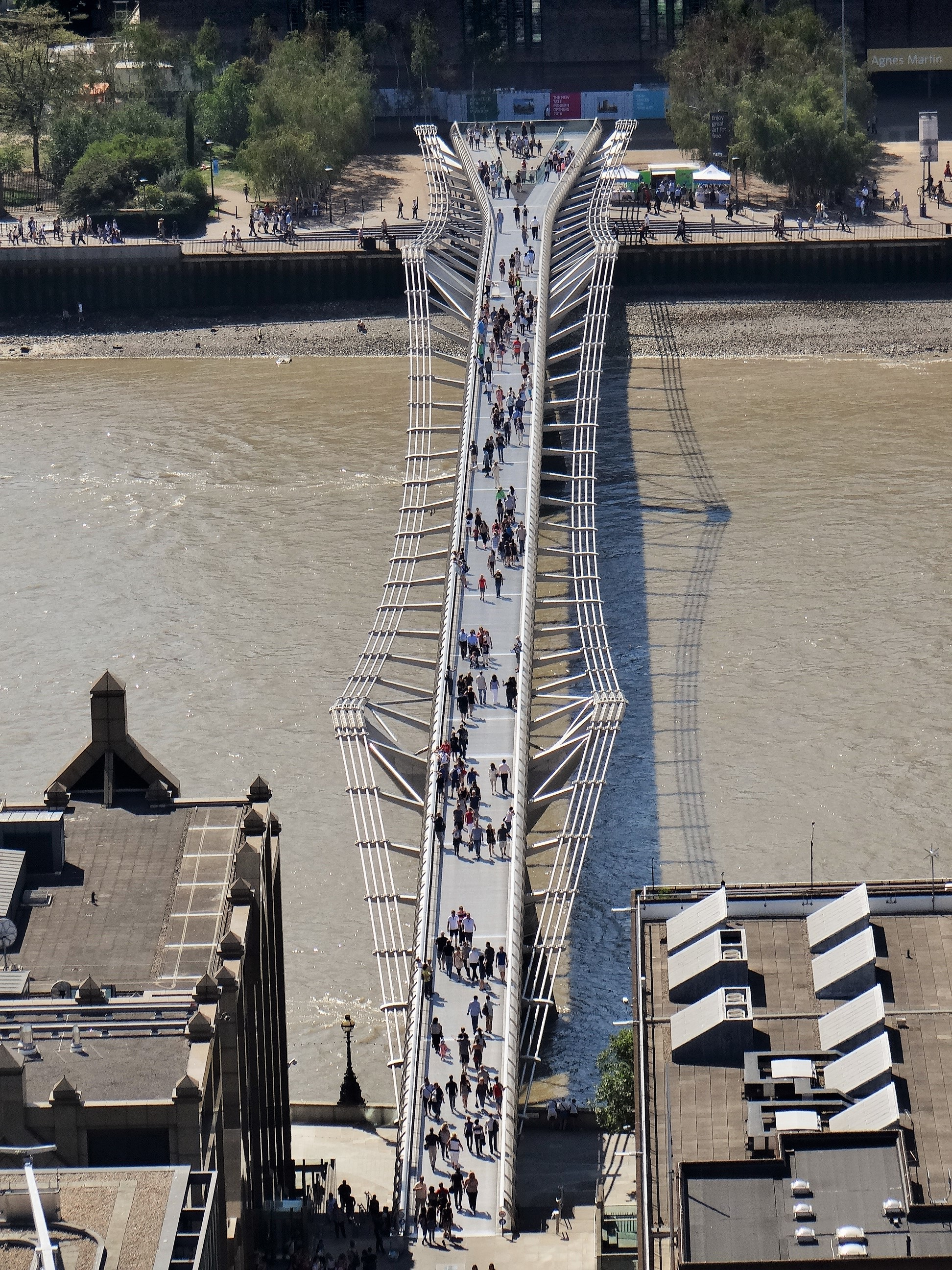
- The bridge seen from St Paul's Cathedral.
- Coordinates: 51°30′37″N 0°05′54″W
- Carries: Pedestrians
- Crosses: River Thames
- Locale: London, England
- Official name: London Millennium Footbridge
- Maintained by: Bridge House Estates, City of London Corporation
- Preceded by: Blackfriars Railway Bridge
- Followed by: Southwark Bridge

Characteristics
- Design: Suspension bridge
- Total length: 325 metres (1,066 ft)
- Width: 4 metres (13 ft)
- Longest span: 144 metres (472 ft)

History
- Engineering design by: Arup
- Constructed by: Monberg & Thorsen; Sir Robert McAlpine
- Opened: 10 June 2000; 26 years ago

Location
- Interactive map of Millennium Bridge

The Millennium Bridge, officially known as the London Millennium Footbridge, is a steel suspension bridge for pedestrians crossing the River Thames in London, England, linking Bankside with the City of London. It is owned and maintained by Bridge House Estates, a charitable trust overseen by the City of London Corporation. Construction began in 1998, and it initially opened on 10 June 2000.

Londoners nicknamed it the "Wobbly Bridge" and even the "Wibbly Wobbly" after pedestrians experienced an alarming swaying motion on its opening day. The bridge was closed later that day and, after two days of limited access, it was closed again for almost two years so that modifications and repairs could be made to keep the bridge stable and stop the swaying motion. It reopened in February 2002, after real-life safety tests were conducted by 700 staff from engineering consultancy Arup.

The bridge is located between Southwark Bridge and Blackfriars Railway Bridge. Its southern end is near the Globe Theatre, the Bankside Gallery, and Tate Modern, while its northern end is next to the City of London School below St Paul's Cathedral. The bridge's alignment is such that a clear view (i.e. a "terminating vista") of St Paul's south façade is presented from across the river, framed by the bridge supports.

== Design ==
An architectural design competition was organised in 1996 by Southwark council and RIBA Competitions. The winning entry was an innovative "blade of light" effort from Arup Group, Foster + Partners and Anthony Caro. Due to height restrictions, and to improve the view, the bridge's suspension design had the supporting cables below the deck level, giving a very shallow profile. The bridge has two river piers and consists of three main sections of 81 m (266 ft), 144 m (472 ft), 108 m (354 ft) (north to south) with a total structure length of 325 m (1,066 ft); the aluminium deck is 4 m (13 ft) wide. The eight suspension cables are tensioned to pull with a force of 2,000 tons against the piers set into each bank—enough to support a working load of 5,000 people.

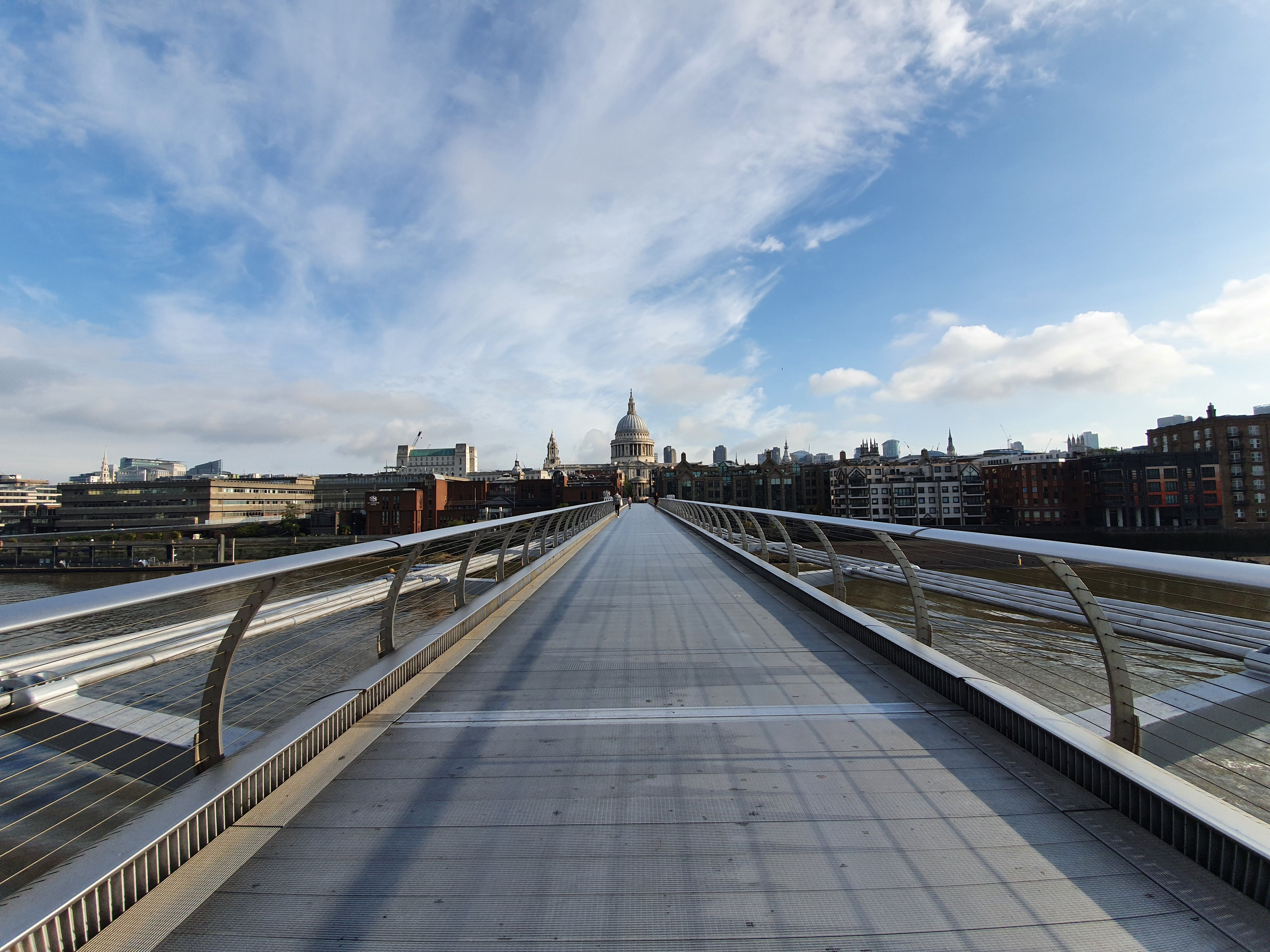

== Construction ==
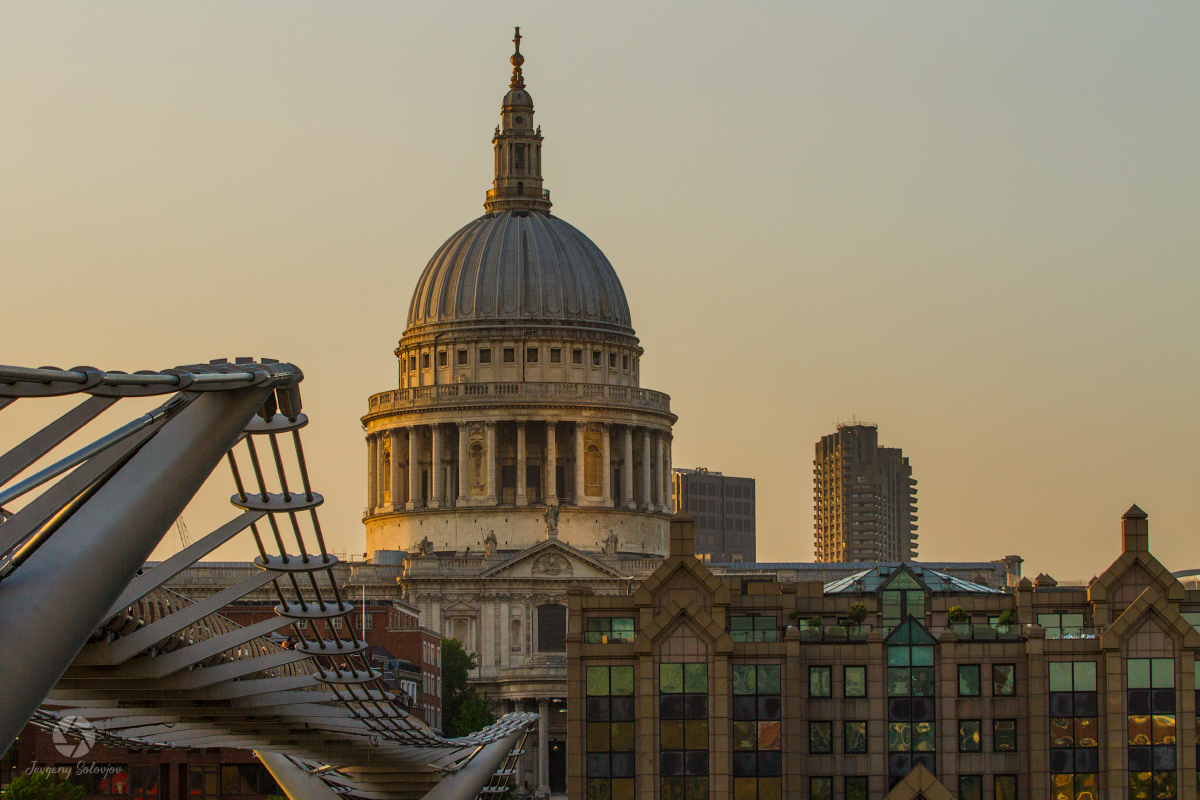
Millennium Bridge

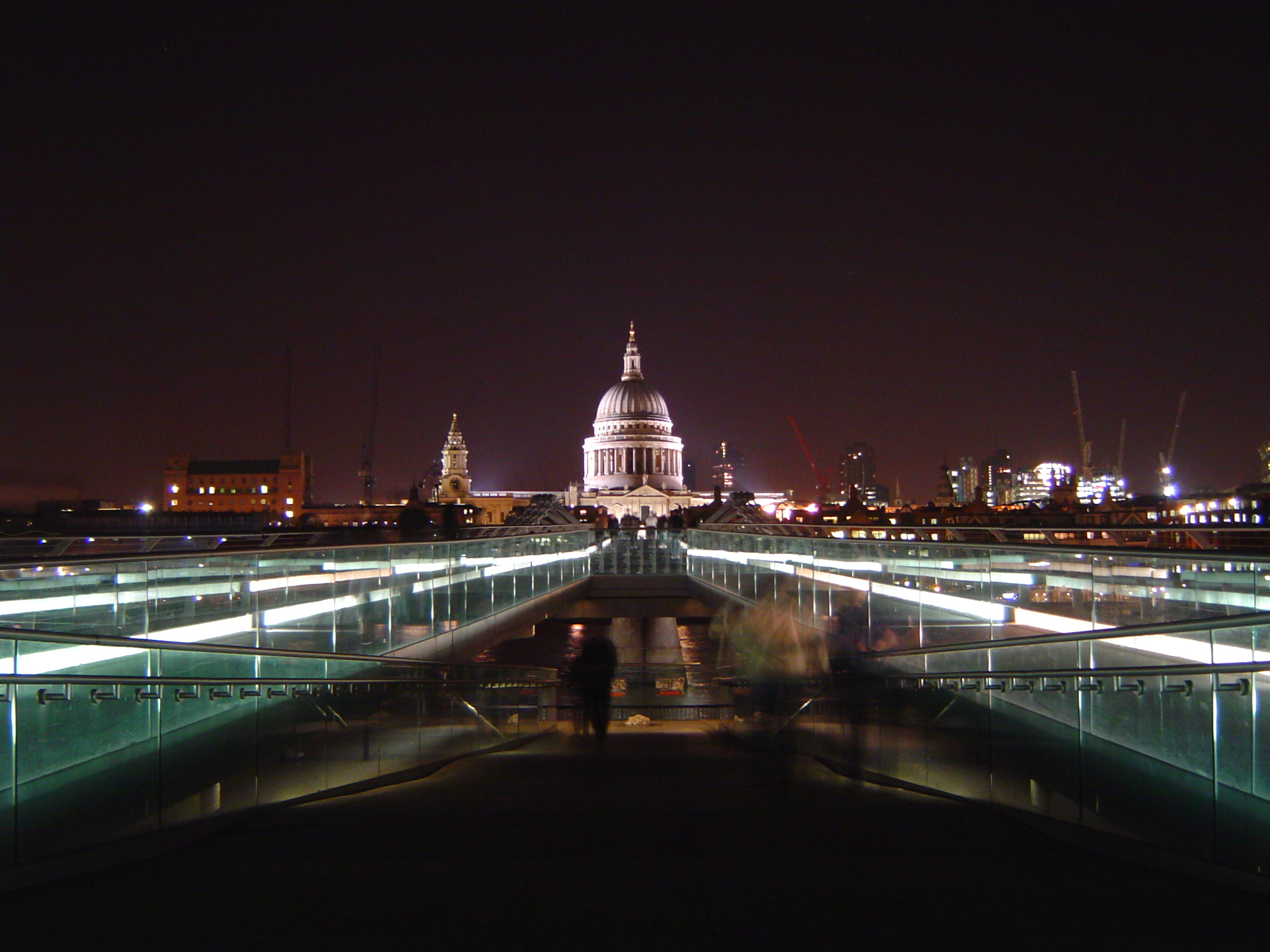
Millennium Bridge at night, showing the much-photographed illusion of St. Paul's Cathedral being supported by one of the bridge supports

Ordinarily, bridges across the River Thames require an Act of Parliament. For this bridge, that was avoided by the Port of London Authority granting a licence for the structure, and the City of London and London Borough of Southwark granting planning permission. Construction began in late 1998, and the main works were started on 28 April 1999 by Monberg & Thorsen and Sir Robert McAlpine. The eventual cost was £18.2 million (£2.2m over budget), primarily paid for by the Millennium Commission and the London Bridge Trust.

== Opening ==
The bridge opened on 10 June 2000, one month late. Unexpected lateral vibration due to resonant structural response caused the bridge to be closed on 12 June for modifications. Attempts had been made to limit the number of people crossing the bridge, which led to long queues but were ineffective to dampen the vibrations. Closure of the bridge only two days after opening attracted public criticism as another high-profile British Millennium project that suffered an embarrassing setback, akin to how many saw the Millennium Dome.

The vibration was attributed to a then under-researched phenomenon whereby pedestrians crossing a bridge that has a lateral sway have an unconscious tendency to match their footsteps to the sway, exacerbating it. This is different from the well-understood problem of vertical sway, which is why troops stop marching in stride together as a unit when crossing such a bridge. An example is London's Albert Bridge, which has a sign dating from 1873 warning marching ranks of soldiers to break step while crossing.

== Resonance ==
The bridge's movements were caused by a positive feedback phenomenon, known as synchronous lateral excitation. The natural sway motion of people walking caused small sideways oscillations in the bridge, which in turn caused people on the bridge to sway in step, increasing the amplitude of the bridge oscillations and continually reinforcing the effect; the maximum sway was around 70 millimetres (2.8 in). On the day of opening, the bridge was crossed by 90,000 people, with up to 2,000 on the bridge at a time.

Resonant vibrational modes due to vertical loads (such as trains, traffic or pedestrians) and wind loads are well understood in bridge design. In the case of the Millennium Bridge, because the lateral motion caused pedestrians to directly participate with the bridge, the vibrational modes had not been anticipated by the designers. When the bridge lurches to one side, the pedestrians must adjust to keep from falling over, and they all do this at the same time. The effect is similar to soldiers marching in lockstep, but horizontal instead of vertical.

The risks of lateral vibration in lightweight bridges are well known. Any bridge with lateral frequency modes of less than 1.3 Hz, and sufficiently low mass, could witness the same phenomenon with sufficient pedestrian loading. The greater the number of people, the greater the amplitude of the vibrations. Other bridges which have seen similar problems are:

- Auckland Harbour Bridge, with a lateral frequency of 0.67 Hz during a 1975 demonstration.
- Birmingham NEC Link bridge, with a lateral frequency of 0.7 Hz.

=== Mitigation ===
Engineers at Arup, the company that designed the bridge, conducted research into the unexpected oscillation, which they called 'synchronous lateral excitation'. The first laboratory studies used pedestrians on moving platforms at the University of Southampton and Imperial College London. Later in 2000, one span of the bridge was instrumented and tested with crowds of up to 275 people.

They concluded that making the bridge stiffer, to move its resonant frequency out of the excitation range, was not feasible as it would greatly change its appearance. Instead, the resonance was controlled by retrofitting 37 viscous fluid dampers to dissipate energy. These include 17 chevron dampers – long V-shaped braces under the deck panels – to control lateral movement, 4 vertical to ground dampers to control lateral and vertical movements, and 16 pier dampers to control lateral and torsional movements. Additionally, 52 tuned mass dampers add inertia to control vertical movement. The work took from May 2001 to January 2002 and cost £5 million. After a period of testing, the bridge was reopened on 22 February 2002 and, since that date, has not been subject to significant vibration. In spite of the successful cure, the "wobbly bridge" (sometimes "wibbly-wobbly") epithet remains in common usage among Londoners.

Dampers

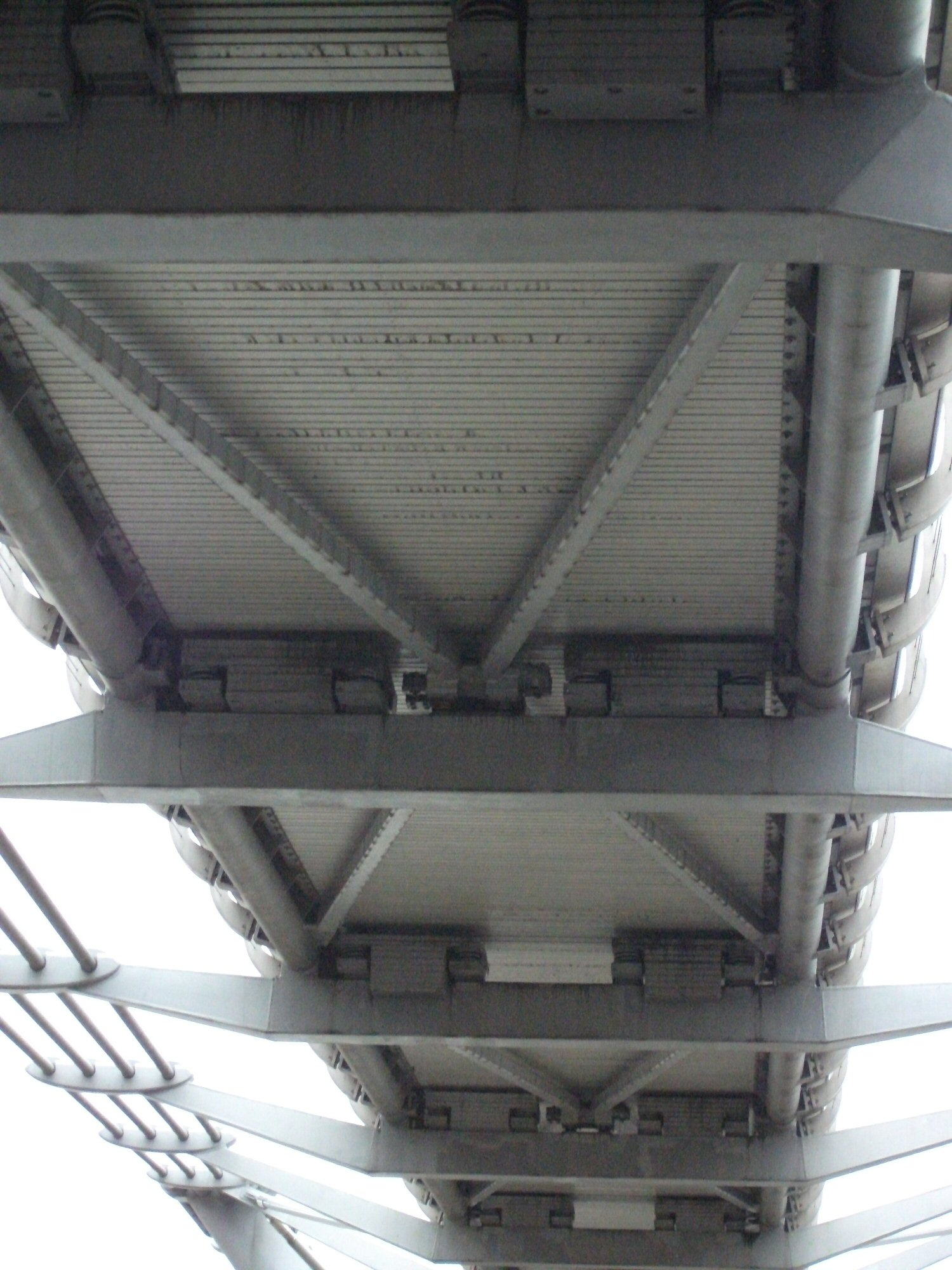
Chevron dampers

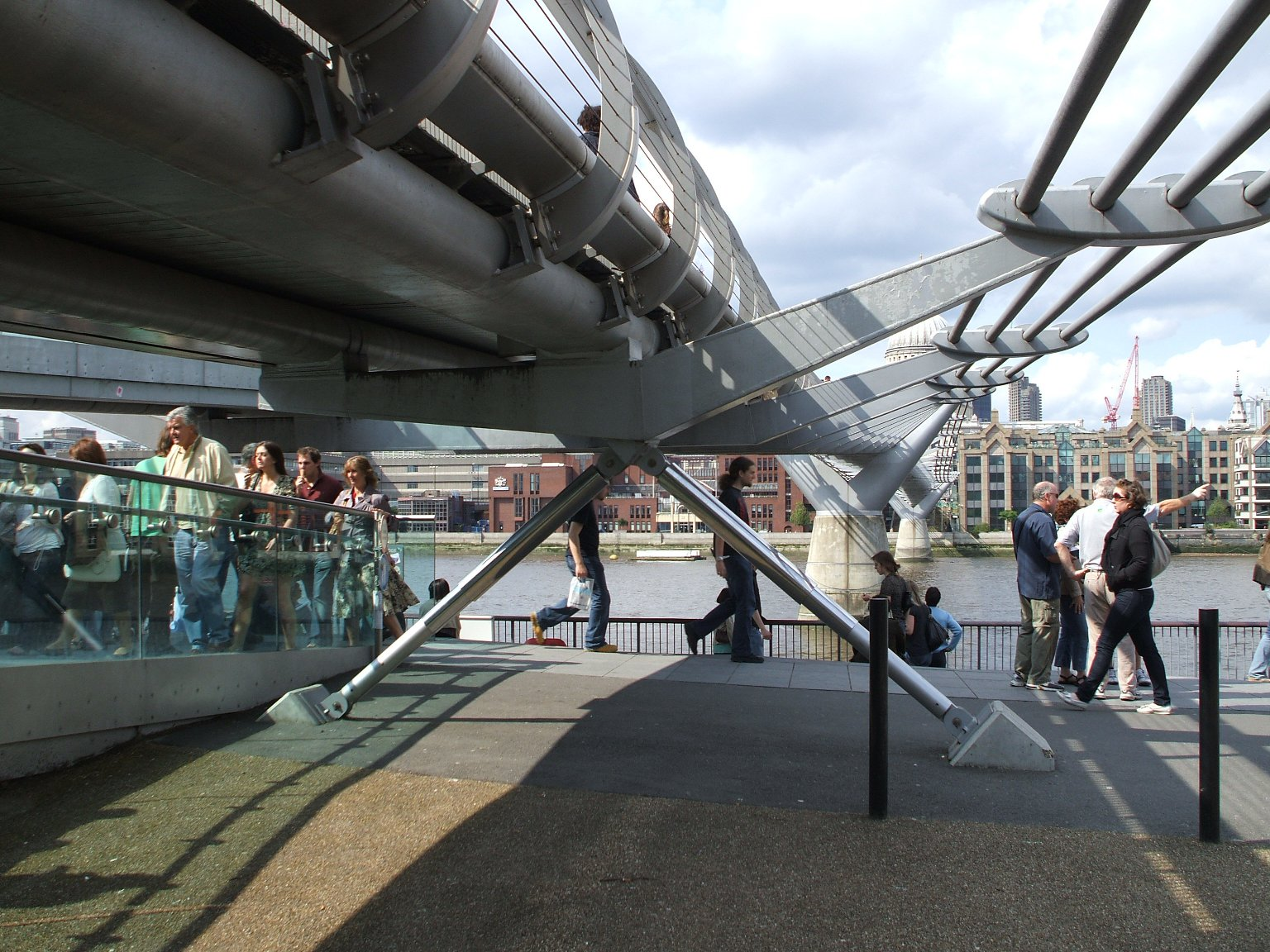
Vertical to ground dampers

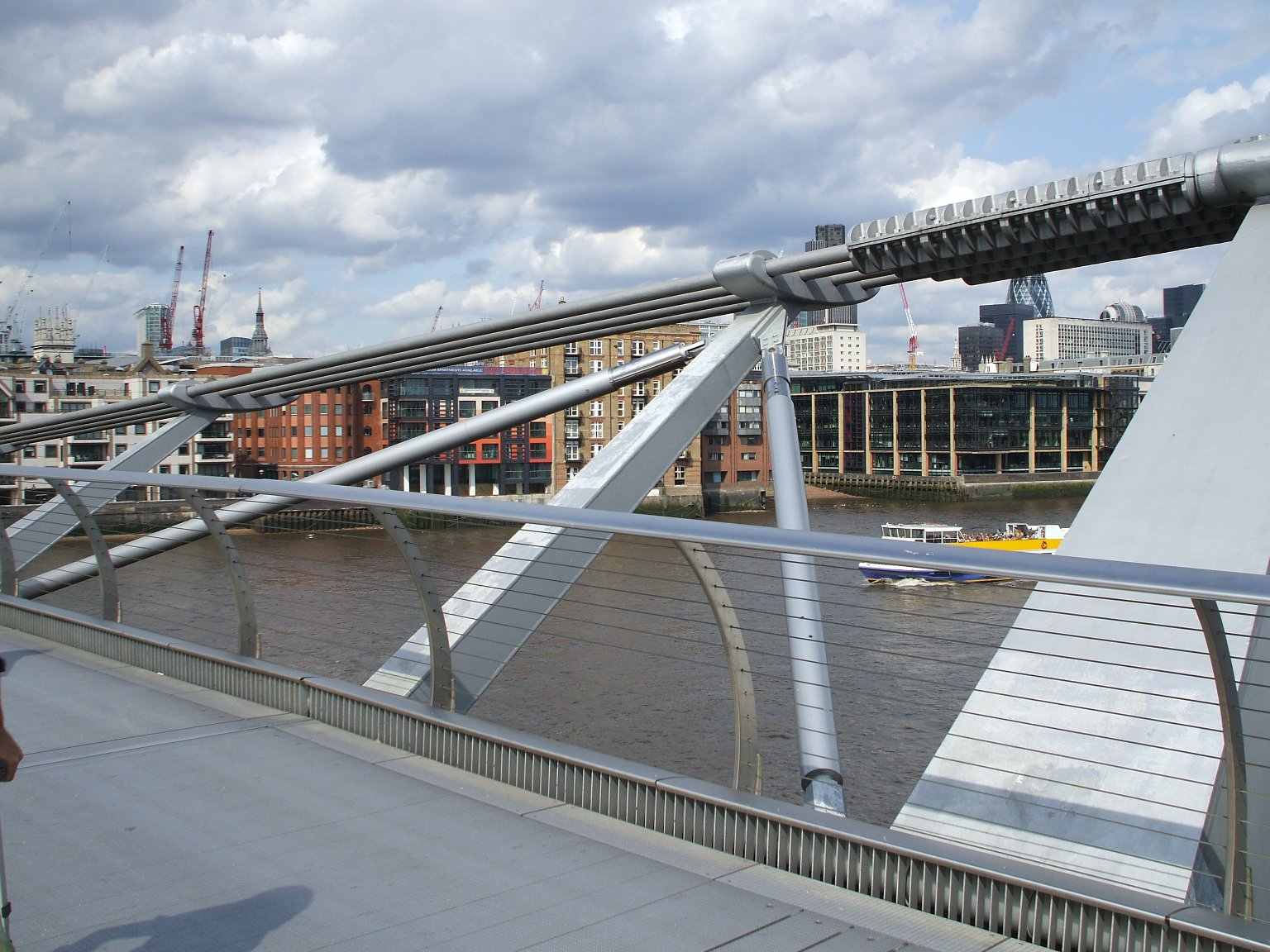
Pier dampers

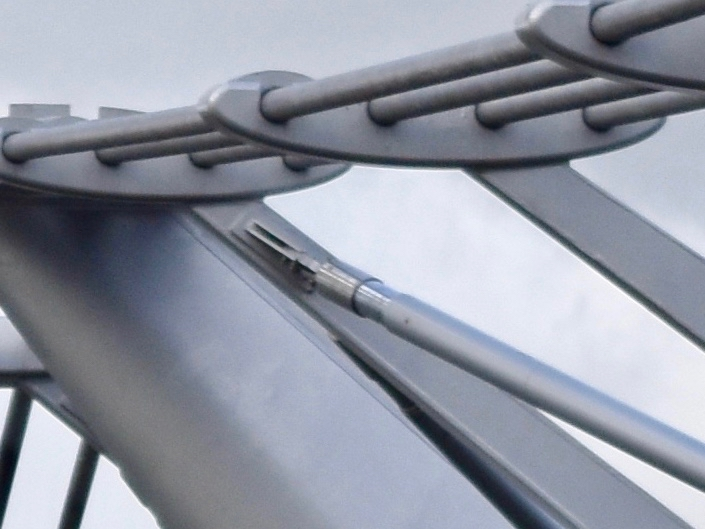
Moving end of pier damper

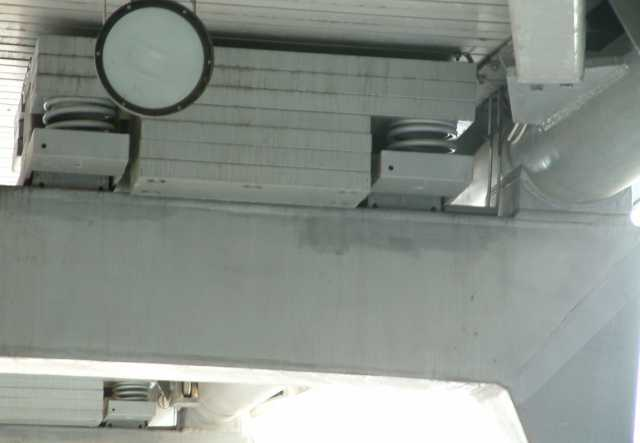
Tuned mass damper

=== Cable resonance ===
An artistic expression of the higher-frequency resonances within the cables of the bridge were explored by Bill Fontana's Harmonic Bridge exhibition at the Tate Modern in mid-2006. This used acoustic transducers placed at strategic locations on the cabling of the Millennium Bridge and the signals from those transducers were amplified and dynamically distributed throughout the Turbine Hall of the Tate by a programme which Fontana entered into the sound diffusion engine of the Richmond Sound Design AudioBox.

== Repair ==
In October 2023, the bridge was closed for three weeks to allow repairs to its surface, undertaken by FM Conway. The bridge closed on Saturday 14 October and reopened late on 5 November.

== Millennium Inclinator ==
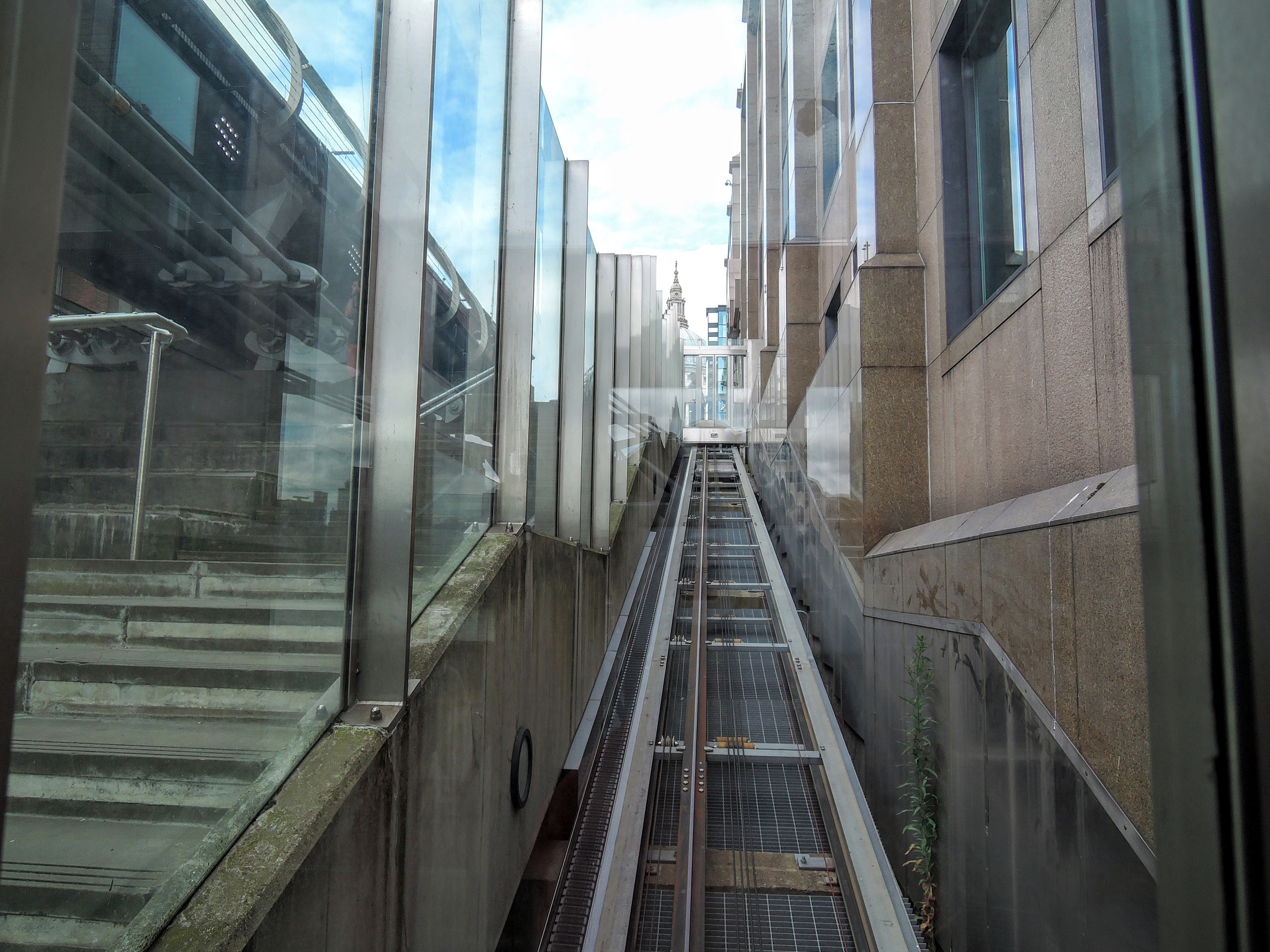
Onboard view of the Millennium Inclinator

A short inclined lift, known as the Millennium Inclinator, is next to the northern end of the Millennium Bridge. It was opened in December 2003 to allow pedestrians to surmount the steep slope (13.6°) of Peter's Hill from the riverside to the entrance to the Millennium Bridge without using the alternative flight of steps. The lower end of the lift is on Paul's Walk next to the Thames, and the top end is 26.85 metres (88.1 ft) further up Peter's Hill on the terrace which is level with the deck of the bridge. It was primarily installed for use by those who cannot easily manage the steep steps, such as people with disabilities and parents with push chairs.

The lift carriage was originally powered by an electric traction motor, manufactured in Italy by Maspero Elevatori, with a speed of 0.5 metres per second (1.6 ft/s) and a maximum capacity of 0.7 metric tons (0.77 short tons; 0.69 long tons). However, by 2010 the City of London Planning and Transportation Committee decided that the level of service was unacceptable, because the inclinator was frequently out of service due to mechanical breakdowns and vandalism. So the Committee agreed it would be replaced at a cost of up to £750,000 in time for the 2012 Summer Paralympics.

A major renovation project was undertaken in 2012, and the lift was reopened in time for the Thames Diamond Jubilee Pageant of 3 June 2012, which took place about a month before the 2012 Summer Olympics. The new lift was manufactured by Hütter Aufzüge of Glinde, Schleswig-Holstein, Germany, a lift manufacturer which was taken over by Otis in 2013. Axis Elevators installed the new equipment. Following a redevelopment of the area in 2021 the lift was closed and will be replaced by a platform lift.

== In popular culture ==
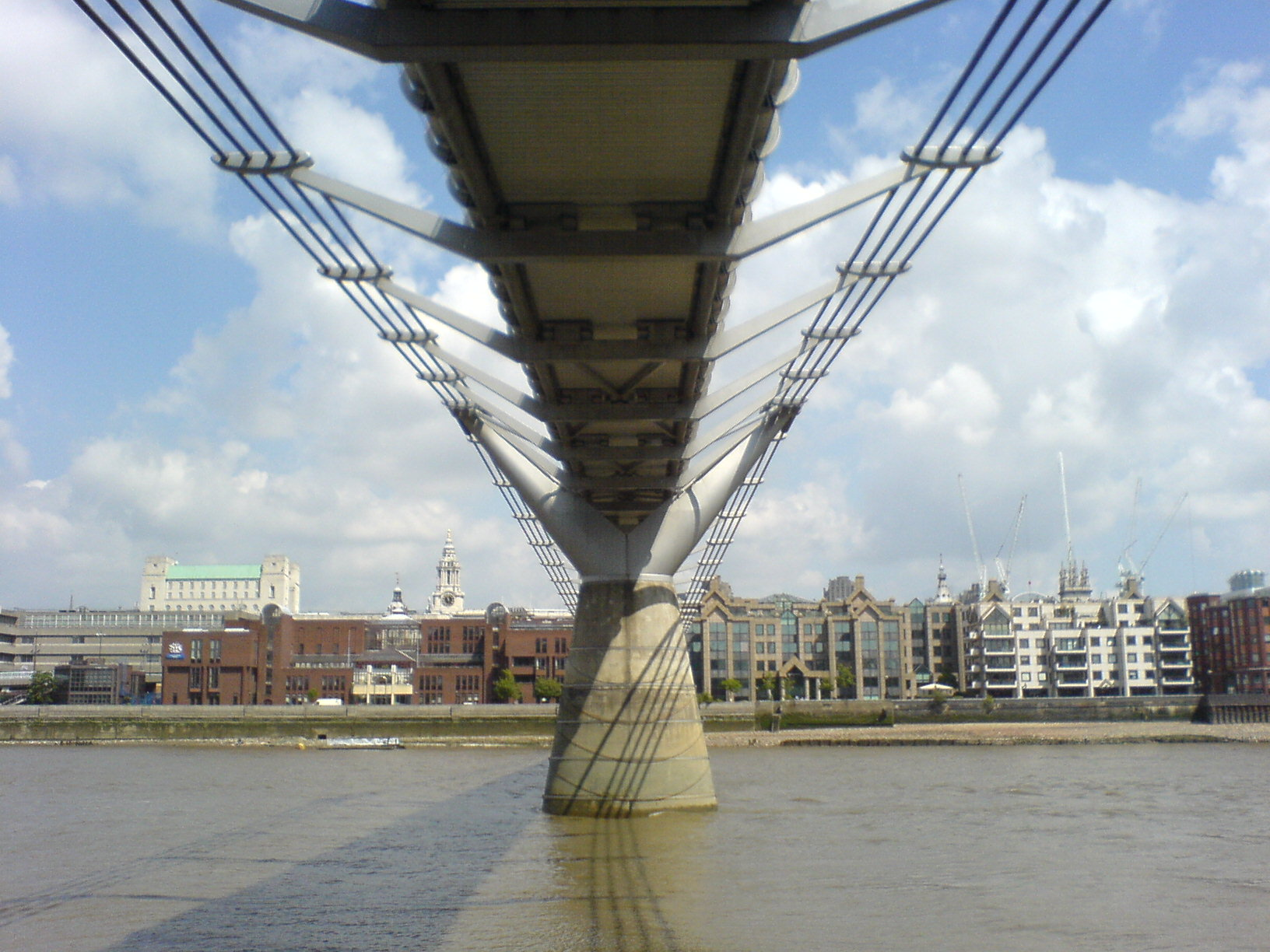
Underside of bridge from Southbank

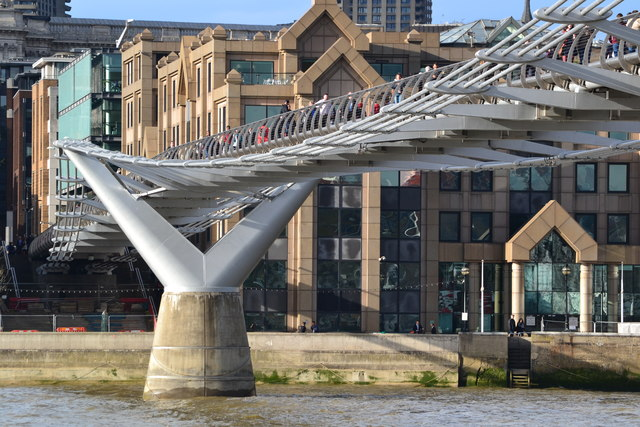
Millennium Bridge and River Thames, looking north

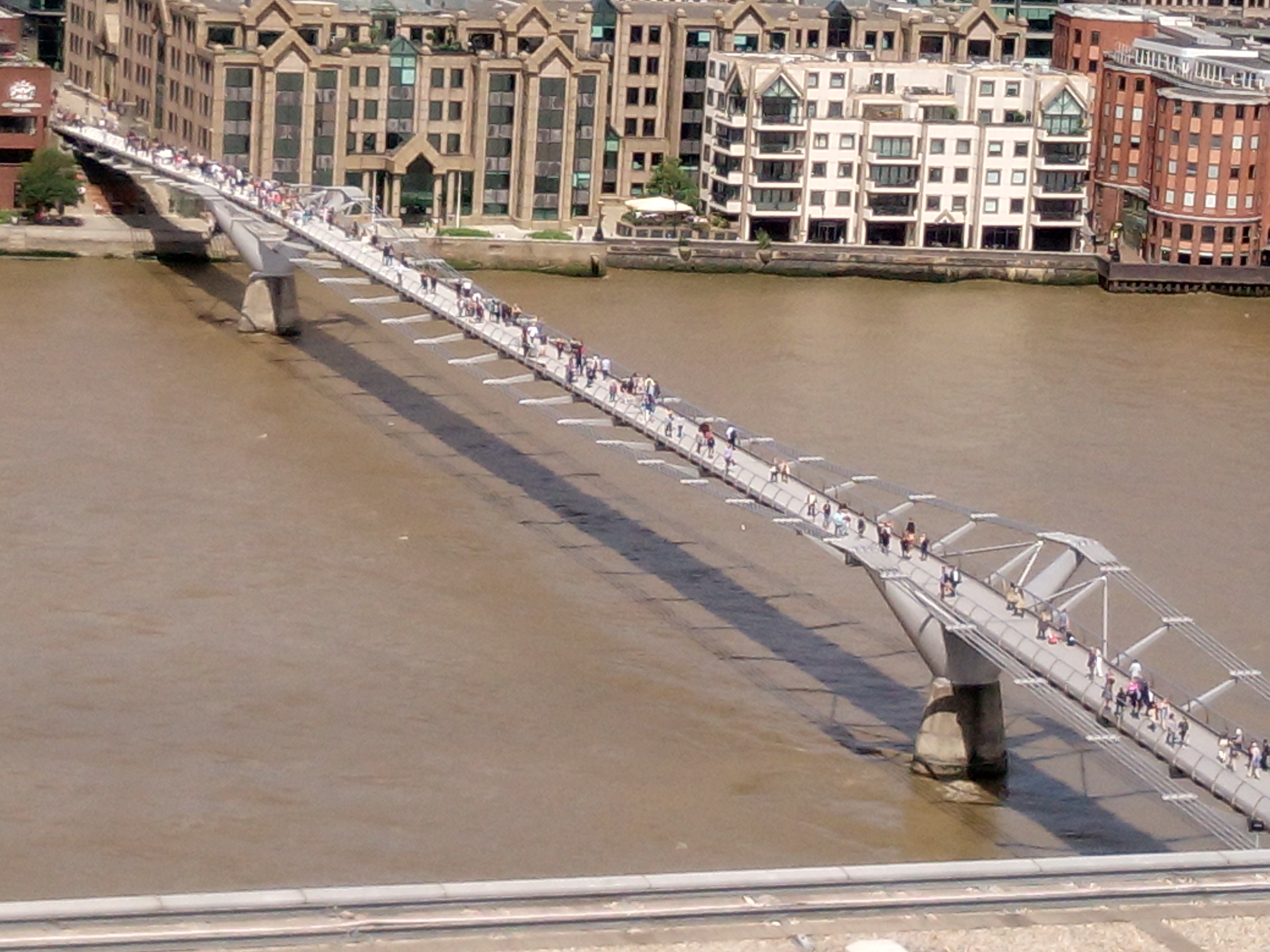
Showing the cable suspension system.

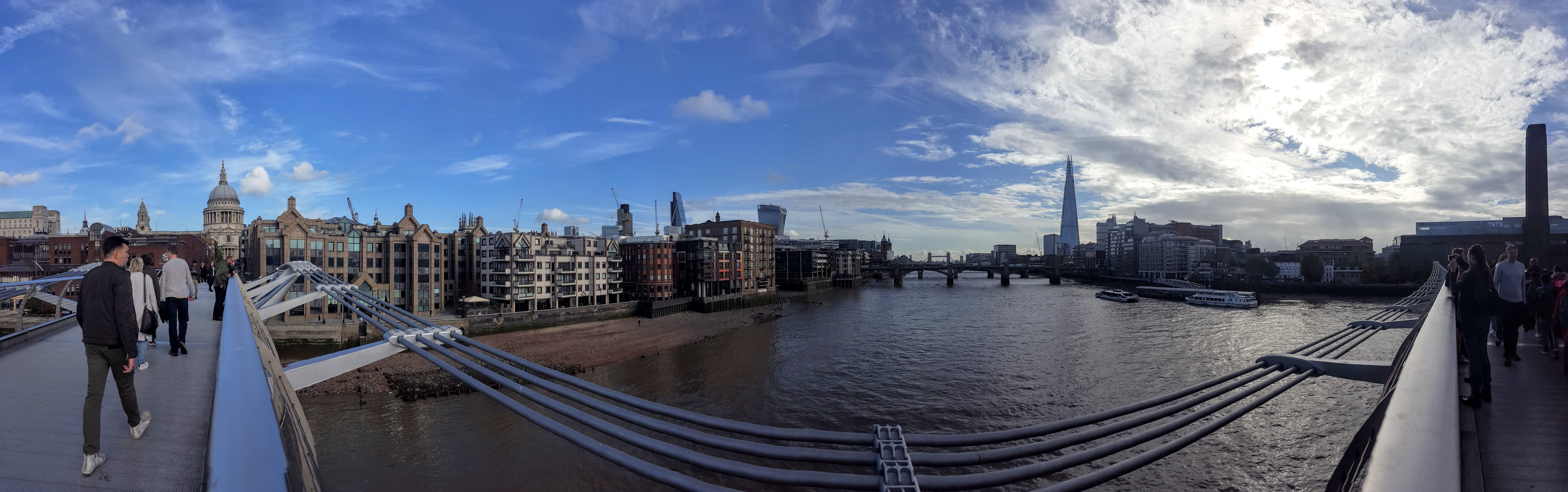
The view east from the Millennium Bridge

- The bridge is featured in the opening scenes of the film version of Harry Potter and the Half-Blood Prince, where the bridge collapses following an attack by Death Eaters. This is anachronistic as the events of the book and film take place in 1996 and therefore prior to the bridge's construction.
- The bridge appears in the 2014 Marvel Cinematic Universe film Guardians of the Galaxy during the climactic battle on Xandar.
- The bridge appears in the 2017 Taylor Swift music video for "End Game" from her sixth studio album, Reputation (2017).

== See also ==
- Angers Bridge
- Brooklyn Bridge—Pedestrian access
- Broughton Suspension Bridge, which collapsed in 1831 partly due to resonant swaying
- List of bridges in London
- List of crossings of the River Thames
- Tacoma Narrows Bridge (1940), original Tacoma Narrows Bridge that collapsed in 1940
- Tay Bridge disaster
