= Underground Library =

Library in Kisarazu, Japan

- 地中図書館

General information
- Town or city: Kisarazu
- Country: Japan
- Coordinates: 35.32484102346224°N 139.98317804633456°E
- Completed: 2022
- Opened: 2023

Design and construction
- Architect(s): Hiroshi Nakamura

The Underground Library (地中図書館, chichū toshokan), also called the Library in the Earth, is a library built within a valley on the corner of Kurkku Fields, a sustainable farm in Kisarazu, Japan. Designed by Hiroshi Nakamura and NAP Architects, it opened to the public on February 16, 2023.

The Underground Library was awarded Best Architecture Design by the Asia Architecture Design Awards in 2024 for its "innovative design and emphasis on sustainability." In 2025, Tokyo Weekender named it one of the most beautiful libraries in Japan.

== Design ==
Nakamura designed and built the Underground Library on a crevice of land that had been previously filled with construction waste but subsequently reclaimed. Rather than build a library on top of the earth, Nakamura intended to embed it within a valley to cultivate a modest relationship of architecture to land; as such, "native vegetation and microorganisms" thrive on the soil above it.

Nakamura's goal was to create an enclave where farmers could read on rainy days or after working on sunny days. Inside, the wood-and-concrete building makes use of natural ventilation and lighting through skylights that can open and close, with concentric designs and mutually supported beams and shelves built in lattice formation. One room also has an adjustable pinhole which can turn into a camera obscura.

With a capacity of up to 8,000 books, and 3,000 shown, the Underground Library's collection was curated by Yohei Kawakami with an emphasis on nature and agriculture, as well as over 50 other categories.

== History ==
Kurkku Fields, a lot of 30 hectares in Kisarazu, Japan, has been gradually prepared and developed for sustainable farming and experimental living since the 2010s. It officially opened to the public in 2019 for visitors to experience a confluence of food, art, and agriculture against a natural backdrop.

Since then, numerous other facilities have been designed and built for Kurkku Fields, including an accommodation called Cocoon. The Underground Library was completed in April 2022 and opened to for guest reservation on February 16, 2023.
