= Hiroshi Nakamura (architect) =

Japanese architect

Hiroshi Nakamura 中村 拓志
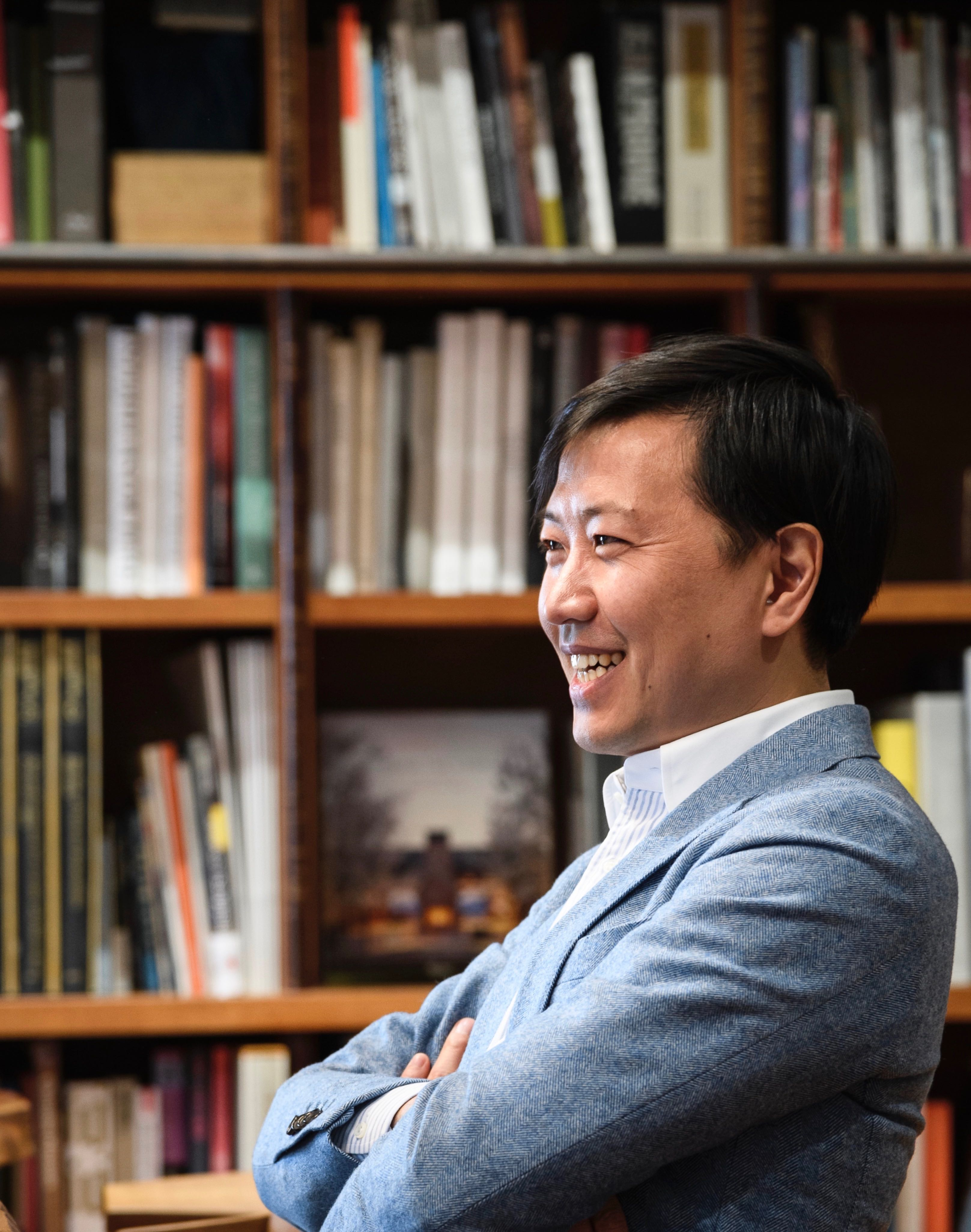
- Portrait of Hiroshi Nakamura
- Born: Tokyo
- Education: Meiji University Graduate School of Science and Engineering
- Occupation: Architect
- Awards: The Japan Institute of Architects Award（2008年） Shinkenchiku Award（2010） AIJ Prize, Architectural Design Division（2021）
- Projects: TOKYU PLAZA OMOTESANDO HARAJUKU; Sayama Forest Chapel, Sayama Lakeside Cemetery Community Hall; Hoshino Resorts KAI Poroto

Hiroshi Nakamura (born 1974) is a Japanese architect, who designed the Kamikatsu Zero Waste Center, receiving the Dezeen, Architectural Institute of Japan and Japan Institute of Architects awards for it.

== Biography ==
Born in Tokyo. Spent his childhood in Kanazawa City, Ishikawa Prefecture and Kamakura City, Kanagawa Prefecture.

- 1999 Completed the master's degree in the Graduate School of Science and Engineering, Meiji University. Since his student days, he has received awards in the field of architectural design.
- 1999-2002: Joined Kengo Kuma & Associates, Inc. Ltd. and served as the office's chief architect.
- 2002 Established Hiroshi Nakamura & NAP.
- Since 2023 Guest Professor at the Department of Architecture, School of Science and Technology, Meiji University
- 2024 Chair, Architectural Design Committee, Architectural Institute of Japan (AIJ), Member, AIJ Grand Prize Selection Committee

== Awards ==
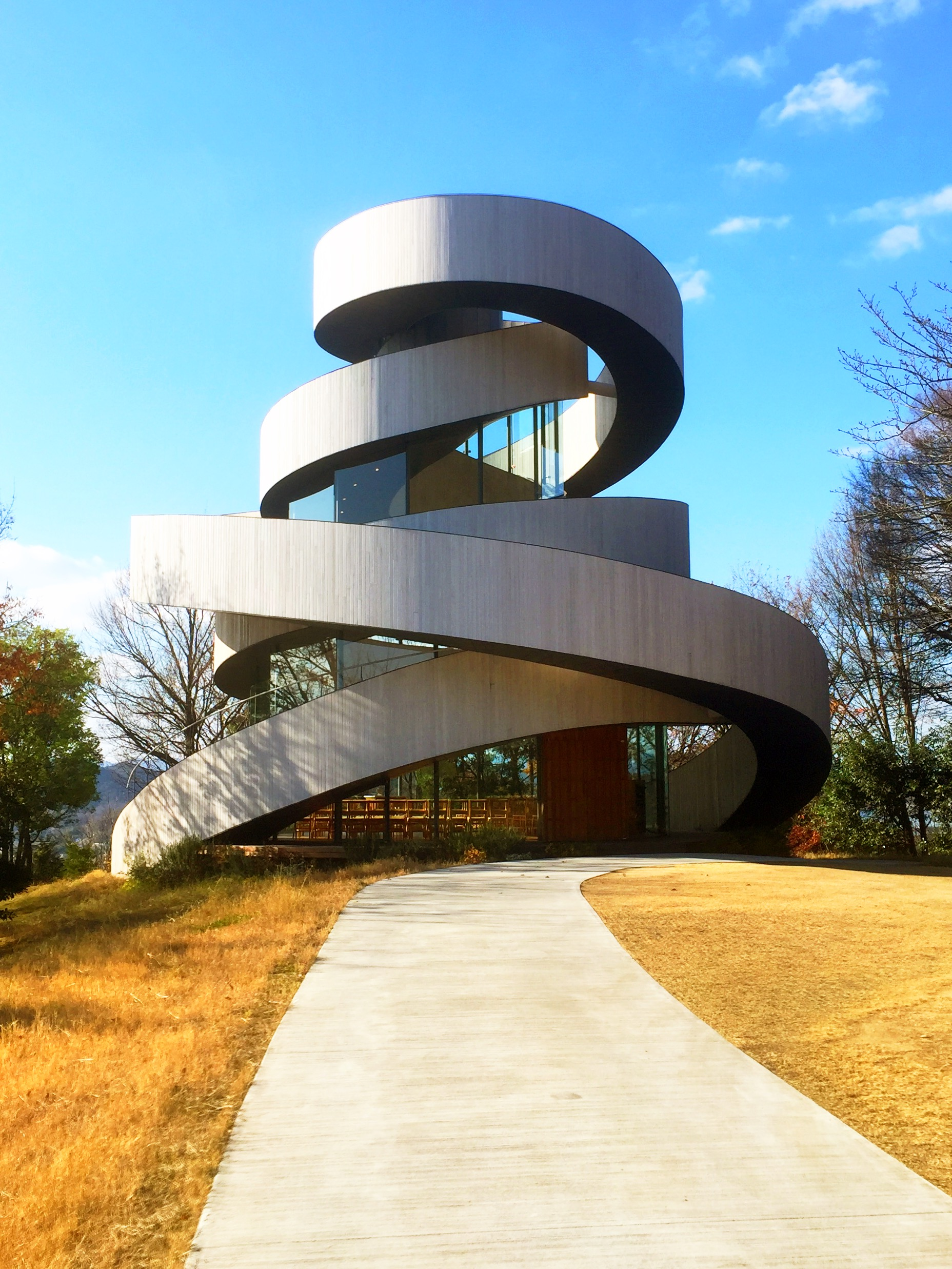
Ribbon Chapel, in Bella Vista, Sakaigahama

- 2006 - JCD Award, Japan Commercial Environmental Design Association, Grand Prize (Lotus Beauty Salon)
- 2008 - GOOD DESIGN AWARD, Gold Prize (Dancing trees, Singing birds)
- 2008 - The Japan Institute of Architects Award (Dancing trees, Singing birds)
- 2010 - 26th Shinkenchiku Award (now Yoshioka Award) (House C)
- 2011 - 22nd JIA Newcomer Award (House C)
- 2012 - AR + D Awards for Emerging Architecture, First Prize (UK) (Sayama Forest Chapel)
- 2012 - JIA Environmental Architecture Award, First Prize (Roku museum)
- 2013 - JCD Award, Japan Commercial Environment Designers Association, Grand Prize (TOKYU PLAZA OMOTESANDO HARAJUKU)
- 2014 - JCD Award, Japan Commercial Environmental Design Association, Grand Prize (Ribbon Chapel)
- 2014 - JIA Award for Excellence in Architecture (Sayama Forest Chapel)
- 2015 - Architectural Institute of Japan, Recommendation (Roku museum)
- 2015 - LEAF AWARDS, Overall Winner (Ribbon Chapel)
- 2016 - WAN Sustainable Building Award, Winner (Kamikatz Public House)
- 2016 - JCD Design Award, Gold Prize (Bella Vista SPA & MARINA ONOMICHI Erretegia)
- 2016 - Japan Association of Architectural Firms, Awards for Architecture (Sayama Forest Chapel)
- 2016 - 57th BCS Award (Ribbon Chapel)
- 2016 - ARCASIA Awards for Architecture, Building of the Year (Sayama Forest Chapel)
- 2016 - WAN Sustainable Buildings of the Year, Winner (Kamikatz Public House)
- 2017 - Japan Association of Architectural Firms, Awards for Architecture (Erretegia)
- 2017 - World Architecture Festival, House - Completed Buildings (Radiator House)
- 2018 - Japan Association of Architectural Firms, Awards for Architecture (Kamikatz Public House)
- 2018 - Record Houses (Lath House)
- 2021 - Architectural Institute of Japan Award for Best Work (Kamikatsu Zero Waste Center)
- 2021 - Japan Institute of Architects Environmental Architecture Award (Kamikatsu Zero Waste Center)
- 2021 - Dezeen Awards, sustainable building of the year (Kamikatsu Zero Waste Center)
- 2021 - DFA Design for Asia Awards, Grand Award, Gold Award, Environmental Design, Workspaces (ZOZO Head Office Building)
- 2021 - JID AWARD, Grand Award (ZOZO Head Office Building)
- 2021 - GOOD DESIGN AWARD (ZOZO Head Office Building)
- 2021 - IIDA Global Excellence Awards, Corporate Space Large Category Winner (ZOZO Head Office Building)

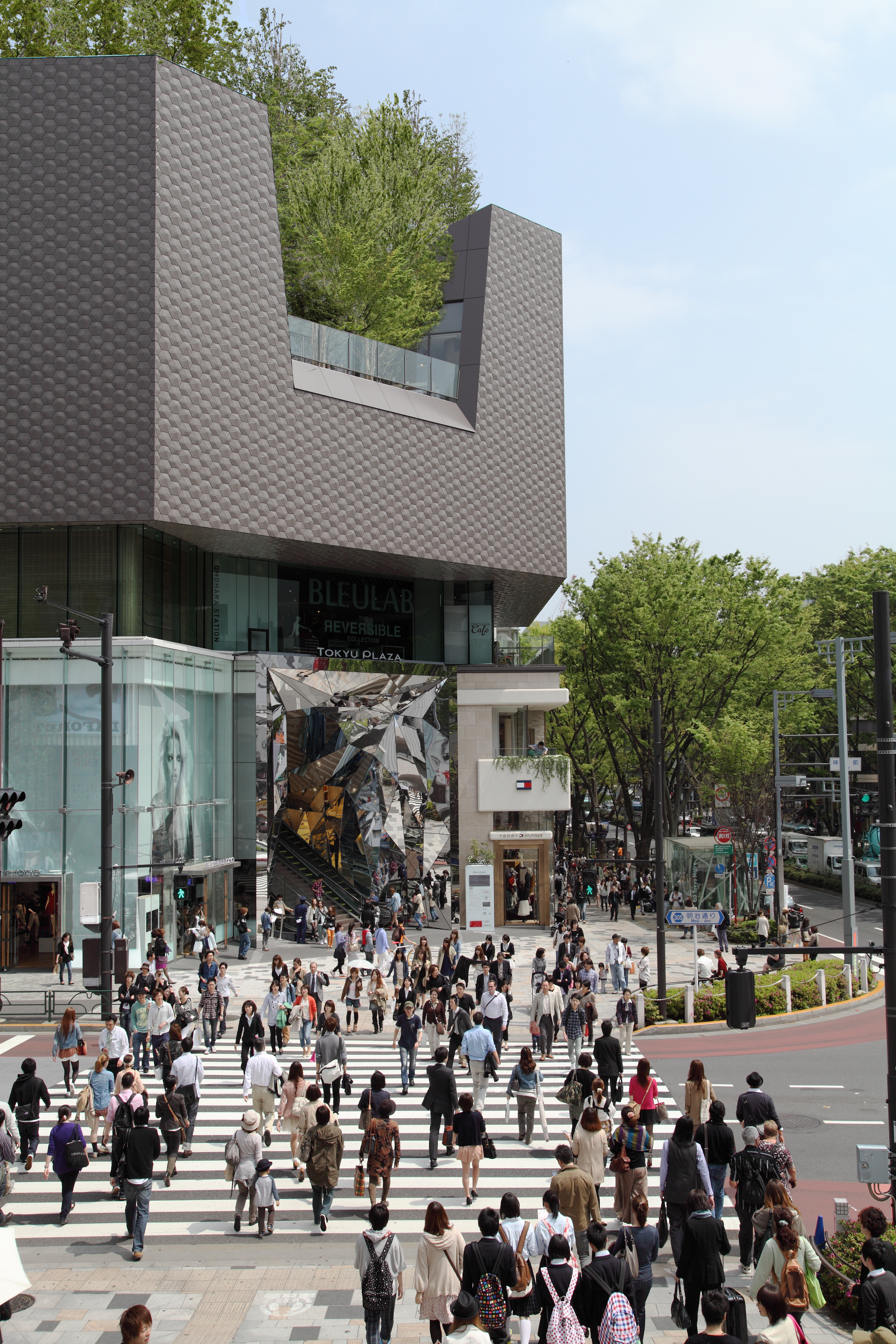
TOKYU PLAZA OMOTESANDO HARAJUKU, Tokyo

== Significant works ==
- Lanvin Boutique Ginza- (Chuo-ku, Tokyo, February 2004)
- Lotus Beauty Salon- (Kuwana, Mie, January 2006)
- Gallery Sakuranoki - (Karuizawa, Kitasaku-gun, Nagano, April 2007)
- Dancing trees, Singing birds - (Meguro, Tokyo, August 2007)
- HOUSE C - (Chiba, October 2008)
- Roku museum - (Tochigi, 2010)
- Tokyo International Airport Terminal 2 Extension - (Tokyo, October 2010)
- TOKYU PLAZA OMOTESANDO HARAJUKU - (Shibuya, Tokyo, 2012)
- Optical Glass House - (Hiroshima, 2012)
- GRAZ - (Tokyo, 2012)
- Sayama Lakeside Cemetery Community Hall - (Saitama, 2013)
- NasuTepee - (Tochigi, 2013)
- Ribbon Chapel - (Hiroshima, 2014)
- Sayama Forest Chapel - (Saitama, 2014)
- Sarugaku Cyclone - (Tokyo, 2014)
- Cockpit in wild plants - (Nagano, 2014)
- Kamikatz Public House - (Kamikatsu-cho, Tokushima, 2015)
- Bella Vista SPA & MARINA ONOMICHI Erretegia - (Hiroshima, 2015)
- Finding Rainbows - (Tokyo, 2016)
- Radiator House - (Chiba, 2016)
- House of Glittering Leaves - (Tokyo, 2016)
- Lath House - (Tokyo, 2017)
- Ohori Kindergarten & After School - (Fukuoka, 2017)
- GORA BREWERY & GRILL - (Kanagawa, 2017)
- Laboratory Under the Crop Field - (Hiroshima, Japan, 2018)
- Half Cave House - (Western Japan, 2018)
- Logs on the Dune - (Eastern Japan, 2019)
- Care house of the Wind Chimneys - (Okinawa, 2020)
- Kamikatsu Zero Waste Center - (Kamikatsu-cho, Tokushima, 2020)
- House of the Sacred Rock - (Kyoto, 2020)
- Kasuien - (Kyoto, 2020)
- My-riad of Optical Glass Bricks - (East Japan, 2020)
- ZOZO Head Office Building - (Chiba, 2020)
- Tree Hut on Volcano - (Kanagawa, 2020)
- Hoshino Resorts KAI Poroto - (Hokkaido, 2021)
- Ueno Toshogu Shrine Juyosho & Meditation Pavilion - (Taito-ku, Tokyo, 2022)
- Underground Library - (Kisarazu, 2022)

== Others ==
- He won the Nisshin Kogyo competition sponsored by Shinkenchiku for three consecutive years.
- During his graduate school days at Meiji University, he won second prize in the 24th Nisshin Kogyo Architectural Design Competition.
- He won the grand prize for 'Decorated House' at the Architecture Student Design Awards '97.

== Books ==
- Nakamura, Hiroshi; 中村, 拓志 (2007). Koisuru kenchiku. Tōkyō: Asukī. ISBN 978-4-7561-5069-1. OCLC 675605554.
- Microscopic Designing Methodology, Hiroshi Nakamura, March 20, 2010, INAX Publishing
- Regional Social Sphere Model: Conceptualizing the space between the state and the individual, Riken Yamamoto + Hiroshi Nakamura + Ryuji Fujimura + Go Hasegawa + Koji Hara + Masaru Kaneko + Hiroki Azuma, March 30, 2010, INAX Publishing
- The Art of Architectural Reading, Akihisa Hirata + Sosuke Fujimoto + Hiroshi Nakamura + Yasutaka Yoshimura + Hideyuki Nakayama, October 25, 2010, TOTO Publishing
- Chronicle - JA114/Hiroshi Nakamura & NAP, Hiroshi Nakamura, June 10, 2019, Shinkenchiku-Sha
