= Ribbon Chapel =

Chapel in Hiroshima, Japan

- リボンチャペル
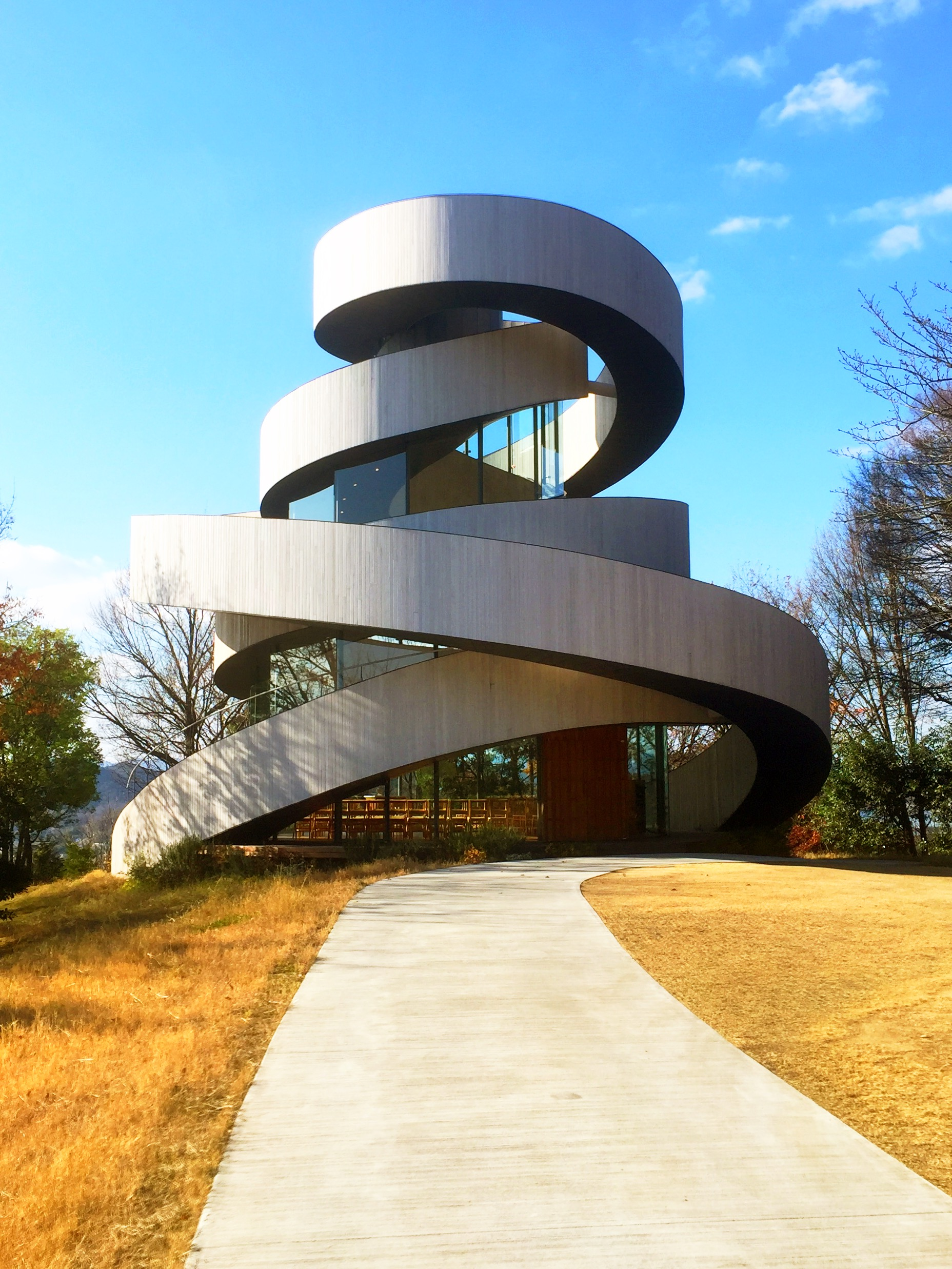
- Interactive map of the Ribbon Chapel area

General information
- Location: 1344-2 Oobiraki Urasakicho, Onomichishi, Hiroshima, Japan
- Coordinates: 34.3935723°N 133.2867953°E
- Opened: December 2013
- Owner: Tsuneishi Resorts

Design and construction
- Architects: Hiroshi Nakamura & NAP; Structural: Ove Arup & Partners

Ribbon Chapel (Japanese: リボンチャペル) is a wedding venue in Onomichi, Hiroshima, Japan, with a panoramic view of Seto Inland Sea. The building, which is an element of the Bella Vista Spa & Marina Onomichi resort, was designed by Hiroshi Nakamura and NAP. The ceremonial space seats 80.

== History ==
The chapel and the resort generally are part of the redevelopment of an older hotel originally constructed by Tsuneishi Shipbuilding for visiting clients and local tourists. Tsuneishi Shipbuilding and the resort are both now part of a conglomerate called Tsuneishi Holdings.

Nakamura and NAP also designed Sayama Forest Chapel in Saitama and the Roku Museum in Oyama. A magazine feature article on Sayama Forest Chapel, which was built around the same time as Ribbon Chapel, stated that architect Nakamura is known for his "sensorial designs, using finite expressions to create unique phenomenological spaces."

== Design ==
The most distinctive feature of the chapel is the double spiral staircase, in which two conical helicoid forms are connected at the top. The interior is glass-walled, and the double spiral staircase is ubiquitous, serving as the exterior walls and ceiling. The top is an observation deck overlooking the Seto Inland Sea with a skylight. The use of 10-cm-diameter steel columns used only support vertical loads contribute to sense of openness.

The exterior of the spiral is made of wood, while the interior of the staircase is made of a weather-resistant titanium-zinc alloy. Connecting beams are used at four points where the double helixes intersect to prevent the helixes from flaring, rotating, or sinking. The entire building stands on a steel foundation placed on a seismic isolation system. The Ribbon Chapel is 15.26 m2 by 72.2 m2 in size.

== Reception ==
Arquitectura magazine called it "a building of great beauty." Slate described it as an "arresting, minimalist" construction that "uses love as a metaphor and delivers a building that is anything but corny." The Wall Street Journal, in a review of an exhibit of contemporary Japanese architecture, observed "Even small-scale buildings can be a bit spectacular, like the Ribbon Chapel about 60 miles from Hiroshima...Two ribbonlike stairways emerge from a glass-walled wedding chapel, interlocking to symbolize the bonds of marriage." According to Aesthetica, "The two intertwining staircases, which don't look binding but rather loosely interwoven, cross each other at various points and mutually support one another: less like the metaphor of a knot, and more like a spontaneous moment in the tying of a bow."

The building appears in the 2022 Taschen coffee-table book Contemporary Japanese Architecture by Philip Jodidio. Robb Report, a lifestyle magazine intended for VHNW consumers, featured Ribbon Chapel in an article recommending travel destinations outside the Japanese megalopolises.

=== Awards ===
- JCD Award 2014, Grand Prize
- Overall Winner of LEAF Awards 2015
- Wallpaper * Design Awards 2015, Best Chapel
- 2015 Japan Structural Designers Awards
- Finalist of World Architecture Festival 2015, Religion category
- 2016 ArchDaily Building of the Year Awards, Religious Architecture category
- BCS Prize 2016
- Architizer A+Awards 2017, Jury Winner in the Religious Buildings & Memorials category

== See also ==
- Turning Torso, Malmö
